= List of people from Cleveland =

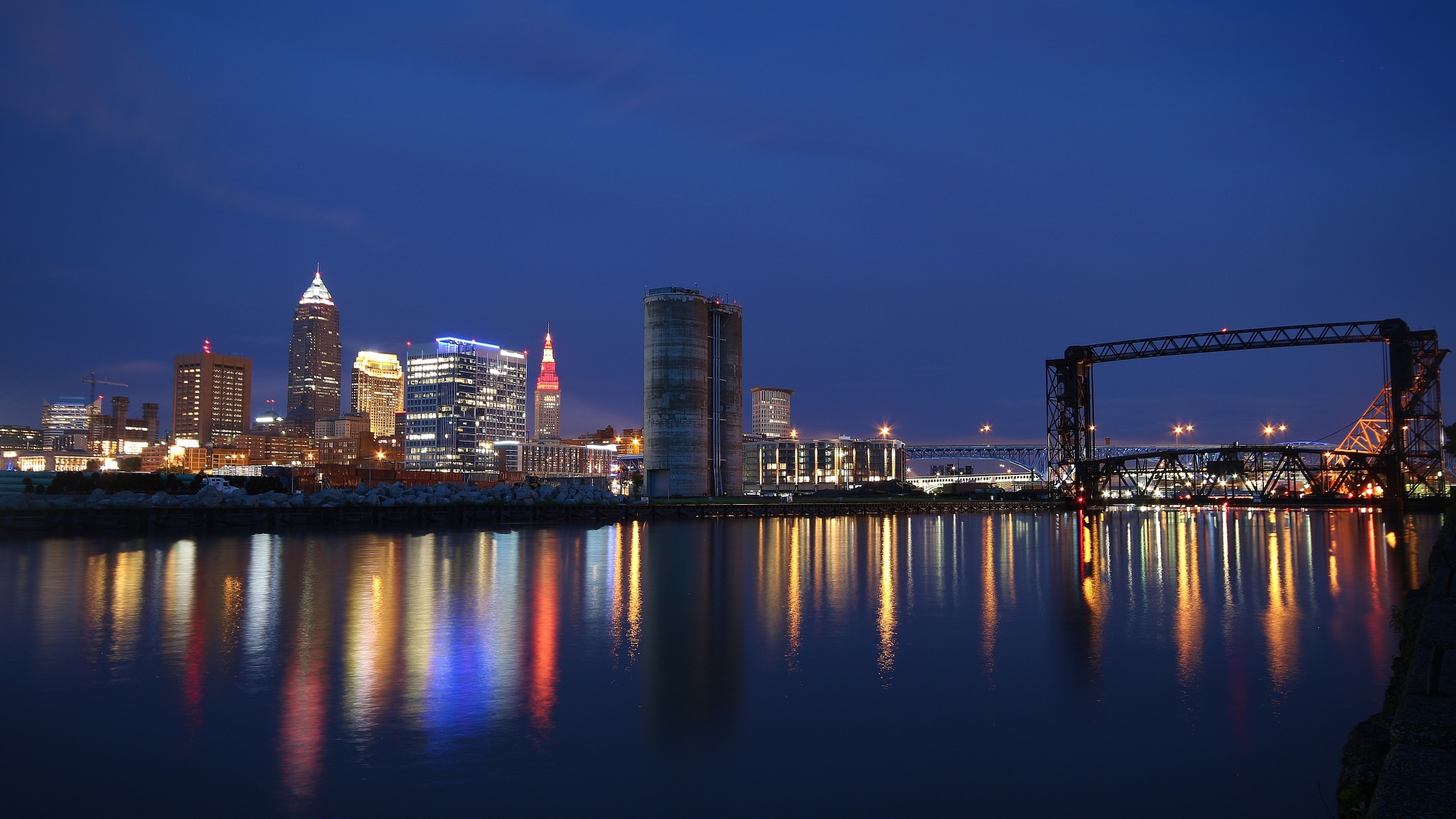
Downtown Cleveland

The people listed below were all born in, residents of, or otherwise closely associated with the city of Cleveland, Ohio.

== A ==
- Tony Abbott, author of children's books
- Richard F. Abel, U.S. Air Force brigadier general
- Tony Adamle, football player
- Steven Adler, original drummer of Guns N' Roses
- Corey Allen, film and television director, writer, producer, and actor
- Kirsten Bloom Allen, ballet dancer and actress
- RaShaun Allen, football player
- Gordon Allport, psychologist
- Ernie Anderson, radio and TV personality
- Ray Anthony, bandleader, trumpeter, songwriter, and actor
- William Appling, music educator, conductor, pianist and arranger
- Graham Armstrong, football player
- Daniel Arsham, visual artist
- Avant, singer
- Max M. Axelrod, businessman and sports pioneer
- Nathaniel Ayers, musician
- Albert Ayler, musician
- Brian Azzarello, comic book writer

== B ==
- Catherine Bach, actress (The Dukes of Hazzard)
- Jim Backus, actor (Gilligan's Island, Mister Magoo)
- Benny Bailey, musician
- Rodney Bailey, football player
- Edward M. Baker, investment broker
- Jerome Baker, Ohio State linebacker drafted by the Miami Dolphins
- Newton D. Baker, mayor, secretary of war
- Bill Balas, screenwriter, director and producer
- Kaye Ballard, actress
- John Banaszak, football player, current coach at Robert Morris University
- Arthur Bankhurst, rheutamologist
- Robert Bardwell, former organist for the Cleveland Indians
- Majel Barrett, actress
- Vanessa Bayer, comedian, Saturday Night Live
- William Bayer, author
- Brian Michael Bendis, comic book writer
- Peter Bergman, actor and comedian, Firesign Theatre
- Haley Bennett, actress
- LeCharles Bentley, football player
- Halle Berry, Academy Award-winning actress
- Justin Bibb, 58th mayor of Cleveland
- Leon Bibb, TV news anchor
- Charles Biederman, artist
- Earl Billings, actor
- David Birney, actor
- Nina Blackwood, radio personality
- Randy Blake, kickboxer
- Hanne Blank, historian
- Mark Bloch, artist
- Max Bohm, artist
- Flesh-n-Bone, rapper
- Layzie Bone, rapper
- Emma Scarr Booth, writer
- Lynn Borden, actress
- Marvin Bower, business theorist
- Earl Boykins, basketball player
- Christopher A. Boyko, United States federal judge
- Alva Bradley, Indians owner, 1927–46
- Lynn Brenne, Illinois state representative
- Regina Brett, author, inspirational speaker and newspaper columnist
- Jim Brickman, songwriter
- Dana Brooke, pro wrestler, bodybuilder, fitness competitor, model
- Robert Elton Brooker, business executive
- Chris Broussard, sports analyst
- Jim Brown, Hall of Fame football player
- Paul Brown, NFL coach
- Shontel Brown, U.S. representative for Ohio
- Yvette Nicole Brown, actress (Drake & Josh, Community)
- Charles Brush, inventor
- Christian Bryant, football player
- Eliza Bryant (1827–1907), humanitarian
- Henrietta Buckmaster (1909–1983), journalist and author
- Jan Buckner Walker, cruciverbalist, author and games creator
- Hy Buller (1926–1968), All-Star NHL ice hockey player
- Isabel Burgess, Arizona state legislator
- Beatrice Burton, romance writer
- Steve Burton, actor
- Judith Butler, philosopher

== C ==
- Anthony O. Calabrese Jr., judge
- Jerrod Calhoun, basketball coach for the Youngstown State Penguins
- Jane L. Campbell, mayor
- Drew Carey, comedian (The Drew Carey Show, host of popular game show The Price Is Right)
- Mary Carey, adult film actress
- Caleb H. Carlton, US Army brigadier general
- Eric Carmen, singer and musician
- Wynona Carr, gospel singer
- Wesley Carroll, football player
- Drew Carter, football player
- Janis Carter, actress
- William Case, 12th mayor of Cleveland
- Ray Cash, rapper
- Ariel Castro, kidnapper
- Andy Cannavino, football player
- Richard Celeste, Ohio governor
- Chris Chambers, football player
- Jason Champion, singer
- Tracy Chapman, singer
- Tim Cheatwood, Ohio State and pro football player, Cleveland Gladiators of Arena Football League and Canadian Football League all-star
- Cheetah Chrome (Eugene Richard O'Connor), punk rock guitarist for Rocket from the Tombs and The Dead Boys
- Charles Chesnutt, author
- Howie Chizek, radio personality
- Kristina Cho, cookbook author and blogger
- John Choma, football player
- Frank Clark, football player
- Gilby Clarke, musician
- Bill Cobbs, actor
- Henry D. Coffinberry, industrialist
- Marc Cohn, musician
- Carl Cohen, executive, father of Corey Allen
- Davon Coleman, football player
- George E. Condon, journalist, writer, and local historian
- Tim Conway, comedian and actor
- David Conte, composer
- Rita Corrigan, All-American Girls Professional Baseball League player
- Tom Cousineau, football player
- James Cotton, football player
- Franklin Cover, actor
- Delbert Cowsette, football player
- Wes Craven, film director
- George Washington Crile, co-founder of the Cleveland Clinic, gave first successful blood transfusion
- George Washington Crile Jr., surgeon
- George Washington Crile III, CBS news, journalist and producer
- Susan Crile, painter
- Dartanyon Crockett, competitive judo athlete
- Matt Cross, professional wrestler
- Francis Earl Curran, 28th mayor of San Diego, California
- Harvey Cushing, neurosurgeon

== D ==
- DaBaby, rapper
- Tadd Dameron, composer
- Dorothy Dandridge, actress
- David A. Dangler (born 1826), member of the Ohio House of Representatives and Ohio Senate
- William H. Daniels, cinematographer
- Mac Danzig, mixed martial artist
- Khashyar Darvich, documentary filmmaker
- Harry L. Davis, mayor, governor
- Ruby Dee, actress
- Donald DeFreeze, leader of Symbionese Liberation Army
- Ed Delahanty, baseball player
- Cheri Dennis, singer
- Dominic Dieter, radio personality
- Tony Discenzo, football player
- Charles Dolan, media mogul
- Larry Dolan, owner of the Cleveland Guardians
- Patty Donahue, singer
- Phil Donahue, television personality
- Stephen R. Donaldson, novelist
- Conya Doss, singer
- Mike Douglas, singer and television personality
- Herbert H. Dow, industrialist, Dow Chemical founder
- Sharon Draper, educator
- Stan Drayton, football coach
- Keir Dullea, actor (2001: A Space Odyssey)
- Jerry Dybzinski, baseball player

== E ==
- Mike Easler, baseball player
- Dennis E. Eckart politician
- Geraldine Edwards, baseball player
- Kevin Edwards, basketball player
- Eric Ehrmann, journalist
- Paul Eiding, voice actor
- Judyann Elder, actress
- Jayrone Elliott, football player
- John Elliott, musician and member of Emeralds
- Harlan Ellison, author
- John A. Ellsler, acting teacher
- Joe Eszterhas, screenwriter
- Lee Evans, football player
- John C. Ewers, ethnologist

== F ==
- Dominick Farinacci, musician
- Sean Faris, actor
- William Feather, publisher and author
- Ed Feighan, politician
- Bob Feller, Hall of Fame baseball pitcher
- Dick Feagler, newspaper columnist, playwright and TV personality
- Frederick Fennell, conductor
- Cristina Ferrare, TV personality
- George Fett, cartoonist
- Bobby Few, musician
- Rich Fields, meteorologist
- Antwone Fisher, writer
- George Fitzsimmons, serial killer
- London Fletcher, football player
- Miriam Flynn, actress
- Quinton Flynn, voice actor
- Dezső Földes (1880–1950), Hungarian-born two-time Olympic champion saber fencer
- William Perry Fogg, author and adventurer
- George L. Forbes, president of Cleveland City Council, 1974–1989
- Dave Ford, baseball player
- Mark Foster, lead singer and founding member of Foster the People
- Alan Freed, radio personality
- Jonathan Freeman, Broadway and voice actor
- Benny Friedman (1905–1982), Hall of Fame NFL football quarterback
- Dan Friedman, graphic designer
- Dan Fritsche, hockey player
- William Otto Frohring, biochemical researcher, inventor, and business executive
- Dorothy Fuldheim, television journalist
- Caroline Furness, astronomer

== G ==
- Neil Giraldo, singer
- Michael X. Garrett, soldier
- James A. Garfield, 20th president of the United States
- Johnny Gargano, professional wrestler
- Teri Garr, actress
- Joe Gentile, author
- Zelma George, opera singer and philanthropist
- Sonny Geraci, musician
- Redmond Gerard, Olympic snowboarder
- Willie Gilbert, playwright
- Ted Ginn Jr., football player
- Ted Ginn Sr., Glenville High School football and basketball coach
- Donald A. Glaser, Nobel Prize-winning physicist
- Gary Glover, baseball player
- Jim Glover, folk singer
- Carlin Glynn, actress
- Brad Goldberg, MLB baseball pitcher
- Bob Golic, football player
- Mike Golic, football player
- Anthony Gonzalez, football player and politician
- Jim Graner, sportscaster
- Elvis Grbac, football player
- Danny Greene, mobster
- Norm Greeney, football player
- Dorian Gregory, actor
- Joel Grey, actor
- Roger William Gries, bishop
- Hiram Griswold (1807–1881), member of the Ohio Senate and defense lawyer of John Brown
- Tom Griswold, radio personality
- DeJuan Groce, football player
- Gordon Gund, NBA and NHL team owner
- Anna Gunn, actress
- Mark Gunn, football player
- John Guzik, football player
- Stephen Gyllenhaal, film director, writer, and producer

== H ==
- Kathryn Hahn, actress
- Imani Hakim, actress
- Arsenio Hall, television personality
- Roy Hall, football player
- Charles Hamilton, rapper
- Margaret Hamilton, actress, the Wicked Witch of the West in The Wizard of Oz
- Anthony Hancock, football player
- Greg Harbaugh, astronaut
- Bill Hardman, musician
- Dorothy Hart, actress
- Kevin Hart, baseball player
- Steve Harvey, comedian, actor
- Mickey Hatcher, baseball player and coach
- Jeff Hatrix, musician
- Screamin' Jay Hawkins, singer
- Geoffrey C. Hazard Jr., law professor
- John Hay, statesman
- Patricia Heaton, actress
- Anne Heche, actress
- John Heisman, football coach
- Jerry Heller, music manager
- John Henton, actor
- Kim Herring, football player
- John Hicks, football player
- Dave Hill, comedian
- Naz Hillmon, WNBA player
- Jermale Hines, NFL player
- Aubrey Hirsch, writer and illustrator
- Wilson Hirschfeld, journalist
- Alphonso Hodge, football player
- Hal Holbrook, actor
- Brian Holzinger, hockey player
- Jessica Holmes, news anchor
- Bob Hope, iconic comedian and actor
- William R. Hopkins, politician, airport namesake
- Desmond Howard, football player
- Terrence Howard, actor
- Stephanie Howse, politician
- Andy Hrovat, college and Olympic wrestler
- Benjamin Watson Hubbard, politician
- Adella Prentiss Hughes, orchestra patron
- Langston Hughes, poet and playwright
- Robert C. Hughes, chemist
- Jane Edna Hunter, social worker
- Ross Hunter, film producer
- Michael Hutter, pro wrestler
- Diana Hyland, actress

== I ==
- Mary Bigelow Ingham, educator, writer, social reformer
- Darrell Issa, U.S. representative for California

== J ==
- Arthur J. Jackson, Medal of Honor recipient
- Frank G. Jackson, former mayor of Cleveland
- Tom Jackson, football player, ESPN sportscaster
- Jeff Johnson
- Larry Johnson, baseball player
- Markell Johnson (born 1998), basketball player in the Israeli Basketball Premier League
- Philip Johnson, architect
- Cardale Jones, football player
- Dre'Mont Jones, football player
- Mary Jordan, Pulitzer Prize-winning journalist
- Rajiv Joseph, Pulitzer Prize-nominated playwright of Bengal Tiger at the Baghdad Zoo
- David Joyce, U.S. representative for Ohio
- Joe Jurevicius, football player

== K ==
- Sean Kanan, actor
- Carol Kane, actress
- Roberta A. Kaplan, lawyer
- Sidney Katz, physician
- Sammy Kaye, bandleader
- Roger A. Keats, businessman and politician
- Jason Kelce, football player
- Travis Kelce, football player
- Clark Kellogg, basketball player, sportscaster
- Machine Gun Kelly, rapper
- Jayne Kennedy, television personality
- Kid Cudi, hip-hop artist
- Lee Kiefer, Olympic fencer
- Mary Jo Kilroy, politician
- King Chip, hip-hop artist
- Don King, boxing promoter
- Fred Kohler, chief of police, mayor
- Boris Kolker, language translator
- Robert Kovacik, tv journalist
- Richard J. Kramer, CEO of Goodyear Tire and Rubber Company
- Valdis Krebs, author
- Dennis Kucinich, politician

== L ==
- Harvey Laidman, television director
- Marshon Lattimore, NFL player
- Dale Launer, screenwriter
- Peter Laughner, musician, Rocket from the Tombs, Pere Ubu
- Frank Lausche, Cleveland mayor, Ohio governor and senator
- Jantel Lavender, basketball player
- Jerry Lawler, wrestler and commentator
- Jerome Lawrence, playwright
- Hal Lebovitz, sportswriter
- Mike Lebowitz, attorney
- Nicole Marie Lenz, actress
- Al Lerner, pianist, composer
- Gerald Levert, singer
- Sean Levert, singer
- D. A. Levy, poet
- Matthew N. Levy, physiologist
- Fannie Lewis, Cleveland's longest serving female council member
- Jazsmin Lewis, actress
- Peter B. Lewis, businessman
- David Lighty, basketball player
- Dwight Little, film director
- Frank Lockhart, auto racer, Indy 500 champion
- Steve Logan, basketball player
- Irene D. Long, physician and NASA chief medical officer
- Joe Lovano, saxophonist
- Michelangelo Lovelace, artist
- Jim Lovell, astronaut
- G. David Low, astronaut
- Chris Lozano, mixed martial arts fighter

== M ==
- Mike Malott, mixed martial artist
- James S. Mace, politician
- Michaelis Machol (1845–1912), rabbi
- Steve Malovic (1956–2007), American-Israeli basketball player
- Henry Mancini, Oscar and Grammy Award-winning composer
- Madeline Manning, track and field Olympic gold medalist
- Nick Margevicius, MLB pitcher
- Flora Stone Mather, philanthropist, wife of Samuel Livingston Mather II
- Samuel Livingston Mather, industrialist, co-founder of Cleveland-Cliffs
- Samuel Livingston Mather II, philanthropist, industrialist, co-founder of Pickands Mather Group
- Samuel Livingston Mather III, philanthropist, industrialist
- Diane McBain, actress
- Arthur B. McBride, businessman who co-founded the Cleveland Browns football team
- Liz McComb, singer
- Michael McElroy, actor
- Tim McGee, football player
- Mark McGuire, musician and member of Emeralds
- Tommy Mercer, professional wrestler
- Burgess Meredith, actor (Rocky, Grumpy Old Men, Batman)
- Biagio Messina, TV producer, filmmaker, actor
- Howard Metzenbaum, former state representative and U.S. senator
- Bill Mitchell, automotive designer
- Nick Mileti, sports mogul
- Tim Misny, lawyer
- The Miz, pro wrestler
- Antwaun Molden, football player
- Isabela Moner, singer and actress
- Richard Montanari
- Toccara Montgomery, Olympic wrestler
- Fred Moore, first African American tomb guard for the Tomb of the Unknown Soldier (Arlington); this broke one of the US Army's most historic color lines
- Rudy Ray Moore, actor
- Anthony Morgan, football player
- Daniel E. Morgan, politician
- Garrett Morgan, inventor of the Safety Hood
- William Alexander Morgan, former soldier who moved to Cuba to help the Cuban Revolution
- Tom Moriarty, football player
- Greg Morris, actor
- Toni Morrison (1931–2019), Pulitzer Prize-winning novelist
- Albert Reynolds Morse, businessman and philanthropist
- Bob Mrosko, football player
- Scott Mruczkowski, football player

== N ==
- Tom Nagel, actor, film director, and producer
- Fred Neil, folk singer, songwriter, and dolphin preservationist
- Paul Newman, Oscar-winning actor, director, auto racer, philanthropist
- Jonathan Newsome, NFL player
- Kenneth Nichols, civil engineer and contributor to the Manhattan Project
- Chuck Noll, coach of Super Bowl champion Pittsburgh Steelers
- Andre Norton, science-fiction writer
- Onya Nurve, drag queen

== O ==
- Charles Oakley, basketball player
- John O'Brien, author
- Kelly O'Donnell, television journalist
- Terrence O'Donnell, judge
- Ron O'Neal, actor
- Susan Orlean, journalist and author
- Benjamin Orr, musician, The Cars
- Jesse Owens, iconic athlete, Olympic champion
- Walter Owens, Negro league baseball player
- Mehmet Oz, doctor, television personality

== P ==
- Lawanda Page, actress
- Paul Palnik, artist
- Sam Palumbo, football player
- Paula Jai Parker, actress
- Marc Parnell, author and ornithologist
- Rod Parsley, televangelist
- Richard Patrick, musician
- Robert Patrick, actor
- Gary Patterson, football coach
- Ruben Patterson, basketball player
- Virginia Patton, actress
- Jake Paul, professional boxer
- Logan Paul, internet celebrity
- Henry B. Payne, politician
- Roger Peckinpaugh, baseball player
- Harvey Pekar, comic book creator
- Roger Penske, auto racing
- Sarah Maria Clinton Perkins (1824–1905), minister, social reformer, editor, author
- Charles B. Perry, lawyer, politician
- Dav Pilkey, children's book author
- Terry Pluto, sportswriter
- Frank Pokorny, former member of the Ohio House of Representatives of the U.S. state of Ohio
- Michael Polensek, member of the Cleveland City Council
- John Popper, musician
- Jason Popson, singer
- James Posey, basketball player
- Joe Posnanski, sportswriter
- Monica Potter, actress
- Beverly Potts, schoolgirl who famously disappeared in 1951
- Joe Prokop, football player
- Henry Prusoff (1912–1943), tennis player
- Bob Ptacek, football player

== R ==
- Stanley Radwan, strongman and professional wrestler
- Dave Ragone, St. Ignatius high school, Houston Texans 03-05, Currently QB coach of LA Rams NFL
- Doria Ragland, mother of Meghan, Duchess of Sussex
- Raz-B, real name DeMario Thornton, singer
- Devine Redding, football player
- Marge Redmond, actress
- Lili Reinhart, actress
- Jack Reynolds, broadcaster and professional wrestling announcer
- Trent Reznor, singer-songwriter
- James Ford Rhodes, industrialist and historian
- Florence Rice, actress
- Bill Rieth, football player
- Eric Riley, basketball player
- Jack Riley, actor
- James Riordan, actor
- Barbara Roads, labor activist and flight attendant
- Bumper Robinson, actor
- John D. Rockefeller Jr., financer, philanthropist, son of Standard Oil co-founder John D. Rockefeller
- Wilbur M. Root, Wisconsin politician
- Terry Rozier, basketball player
- Alan Ruck, actor
- Michael Ruhlman, author
- Rudolph Rummel, political scientist
- Michael Rupp, hockey player
- Anthony Russo, film director
- Joe Russo, director
- Steve Ruzich, football player
- Joe Ryan, Alaska politician

== S ==
- JaKarr Sampson, pro basketball player
- Steve Sanders, former professional football player
- Perry Saturn, pro wrestler
- Ollie Savatsky, football player
- Scott Savol, singer, American Idol
- Scott Ramon Seguro Mescudi, rapper, singer, songwriter, record producer, and actor
- Moe Savransky (born 1929), Major League Baseball pitcher
- Tobias Schanfarber, rabbi
- Tom Schoen, football player
- Xen C. Scott, football player, football, baseball, and basketball coach, and sportswriter
- Ron Sega, astronaut, Air Force major general
- Ed Seward, 19th-century baseball player
- Michael Shane, lawyer, actor
- Molly Shannon, comedian and actress
- Bonnie Shemie, author and illustrator
- André Shepherd, United States Army Specialist who applied for asylum in Germany after deserting his unit
- Dwight Shepherd, United States Navy officer and career Naval flight officer
- Sam Sheppard, physician, convicted murderer
- Henry Sherwin, co-founder of Sherwin-Williams paint
- Cecil Shorts, football player
- Phillip Shriver, historian, former college administrator, and former president of Miami University
- Don Shula, Hall of Fame football coach
- Joe Shuster, co-creator of Superman
- Larry Shyatt, basketball coach
- Jerry Siegel, co-creator of Superman
- Ruth Simpson, lesbian activist, author
- Eric Singer, musician, Kiss
- Matija Škerbec, priest
- Barbara Smith, activist
- Beverly Smith, activist
- Chuck Smith, baseball player and current mayor of Woodmere, Ohio, a Cleveland suburb
- Martha Smith, actress, Animal House
- Patricia Haynes Smith, member of the Louisiana House of Representatives
- Troy Smith, football player
- Frank Solich, football player and current head coach for Ohio University
- Ray Solomonoff, founder of artificial intelligence
- Charles Somers, coal and baseball exec
- Kath Soucie, voice actress
- Tris Speaker, Hall of Fame baseball player
- Nancy Spero, artist
- Frank Stalletto, pro wrestler
- Michael Stanley, singer-songwriter
- George Steinbrenner III, owner of the New York Yankees
- Brian Stepanek, actor
- Lucy Stanton, abolitionist
- Tom Stincic, football player
- Carl B. Stokes, first African American mayor of a major US city, mayor of Cleveland 1968–71
- Louis Stokes, 15-term U.S. representative to Congress
- Lori Stokes, journalist and news anchor
- Amasa Stone, philanthropist, railroad magnate, bridge builder
- Robert D. Storey, philanthropist, university trustee, corporate director
- Rich Stotter, football player
- Vernon Stouffer, founder of Stouffer Corporation foods and restaurants; Cleveland Indians owner
- Ed Sustersic, football player
- Michael Symon, chef, restaurateur, TV personality

== T ==
- Nicholas Tatonetti, biomedical researcher
- James Terry (born 1960), American-Israeli basketball player
- Taylor Thierry, WNBA player
- Josh Robert Thompson, actor, voice actor, and impressionist
- Walter J. Tomasch, physicist
- John Patrick Treacy, Roman Catholic bishop of the Diocese of La Crosse
- Jack Trice, football player; first African-American athlete at Iowa State College (now Iowa State University); Jack Trice Stadium is currently the only Division 1 stadium or arena to be named after an African-American
- Joseph Trohman, musician, Fall Out Boy
- Demetrius Treadwell, basketball player
- Hal Trosky Jr., baseball player
- Stephanie Tubbs Jones, politician
- Barbara Turner, former WNBA basketball player, current assistant coach for the Atlanta Dream
- Julia Tuttle, businesswoman, the "mother of Miami"

== U ==
- Loung Ung, author; speaker; Khmer Rouge survivor; activist against landmines
- Lee Unkrich, film director

== V ==
- Tim VanNewhouse (born 1986), boxing manager and former boxer
- Sander Vanocur (1928–2019), television journalist
- Dirk Verbeuren, Belgian-born musician
- Kate Voegele, singer-songwriter
- George Voinovich, mayor of Cleveland 1980–89; governor of Ohio 1991–98; U.S. senator 1999–2011
- Joe Vosmik, baseball player

== W ==
- Stephen Waldschmidt, playwright, actor
- Neal Walk (1948–2015), basketball player
- Joe Walsh, musician, The Eagles
- Carl Walz, astronaut
- Larry Wanke, football player
- Denzel Ward, NFL cornerback with the Cleveland Browns
- Robert Ward, composer
- Josephine Turpin Washington (1861–1949), educator and writer
- Ted Wass, actor
- Lew Wasserman, entertainment agent
- Bill Watterson, artist, author of Calvin and Hobbes
- Sharon Waxman (born c.1963), journalist
- Mary Ellen Weber, astronaut
- Scott Weiland, musician, Stone Temple Pilots
- Tom Weiskopf, golfer
- Jayson Wells (born 1976), basketball player
- Bill Wertz, baseball player
- Roland West, film director
- Jack Weston, actor
- Michael R. White, mayor of Cleveland 1990–2002
- Kym Whitley, actress
- Donte Whitner, football player
- Eric Wilkerson, football player
- Archibald Willard, painter
- Fred Willard, actor
- Aaron Williams, boxer
- Doc Williams, singer
- Jawad Williams, basketball player
- Debra Winger, actress
- Alexander Winton, Scottish-born auto racer
- Lindsey Witten NFL player
- Bobby Womack, singer
- Cecil Womack, singer
- Mike Woods, football player
- Pierre Woods, football player
- Evan Wright, writer
- Frank Wright, jazz musician
- Shane Wynn, NFL player

== X ==
- Clyde X, leader in the Nation of Islam

== Y ==
- Frank Yankovic, musician, polka king
- Barrie Youngfellow, actress
- Sean Young, actress

== Z ==
- Ray Zeh, football player
- Joe Zelenka, football player
- Dolph Ziggler, pro wrestler

== Groups ==
- All five members of rap group Bone Thugs-N-Harmony
- All six members of Chimaira, heavy metal band
- All eleven members of Dazz Band, funk band
- James Gang
- Michael Stanley Band
- The Moonglows
- Mushroomhead, heavy metal band
- Nine Inch Nails
- Old Grandma Hardcore (Barbara St. Hilaire)
- The Outsiders, 1960s band: smash hit "Time Won't Let Me"
- Pere Ubu, experimental rock group
- The Poni-Tails, girl group noted for their 1958 hit "Born Too Late"
- Raspberries, 1970s band; smash hit "Go All the Way"
- The Secrets, girl group noted for their 1963 hit "The Boy Next Door"

== See also ==
- List of politicians from Cleveland
- List of people from Ohio
