= Glenville, Cleveland =

Neighborhood of Cleveland, Ohio, United States

Coordinates: 41°31′57″N 81°36′56″W

Glenville
- Neighborhood of Cleveland
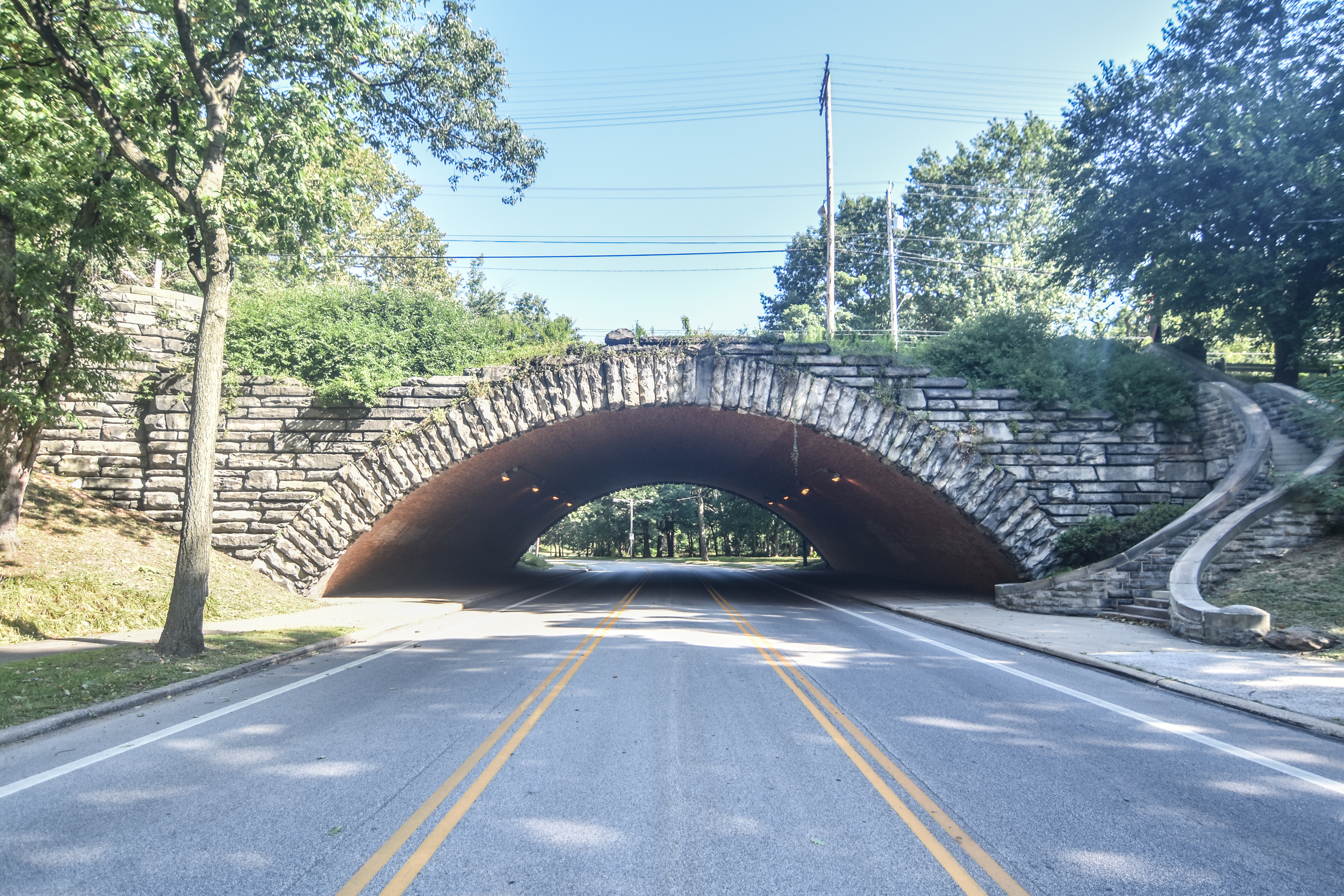
- Wade Park Avenue Bridge

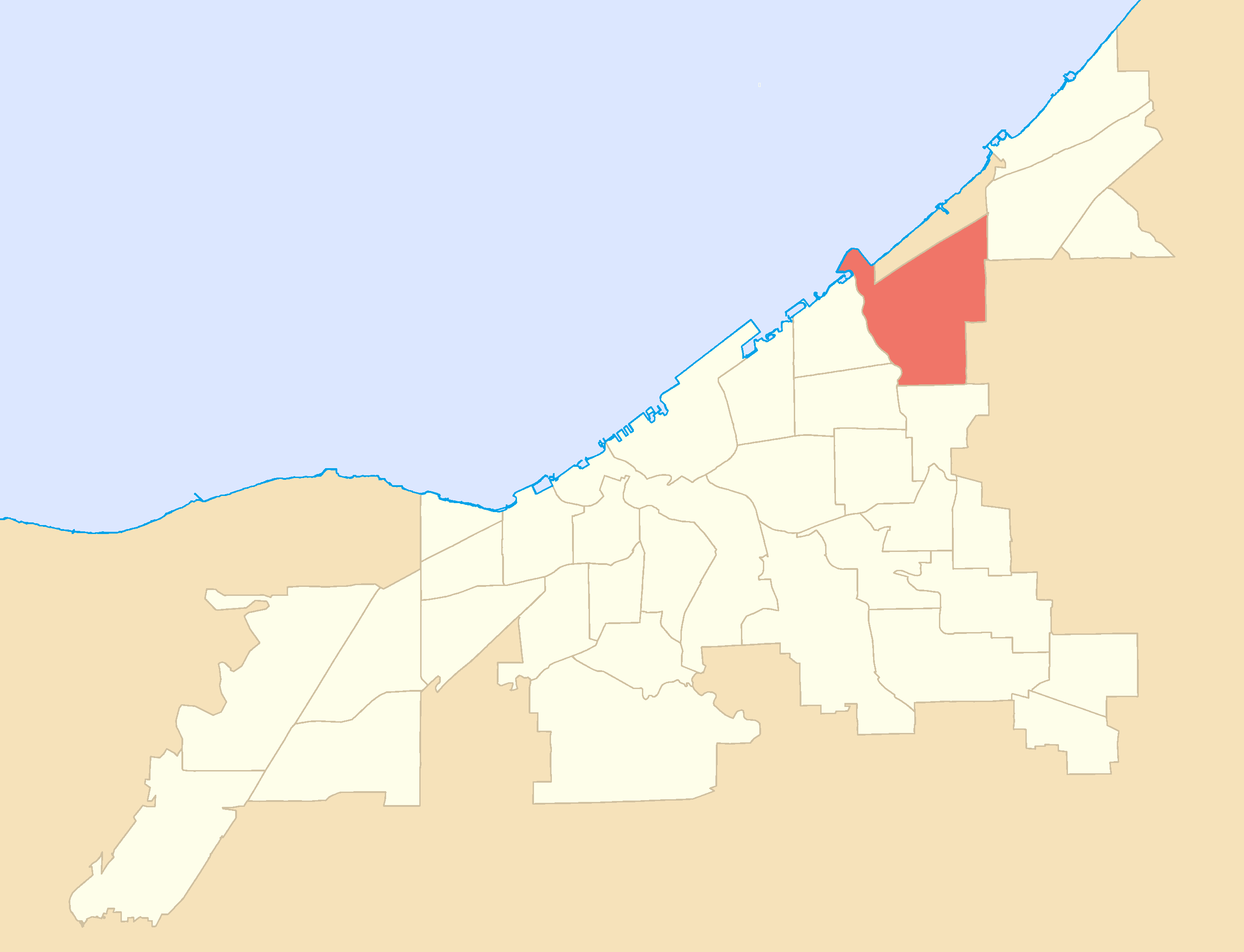
- Country: United States
- State: Ohio
- County: Cuyahoga County
- City: Cleveland

Population (2020)
  - Total: 22,581

Demographics
  - White: 3.3%
  - Black: 93.4%
  - Hispanic (of any race): 0.7%
  - Asian and Pacific Islander: 0.5%
  - Mixed and Other: 2.8%
- Time zone: UTC-5 (EST)
  - Summer (DST): UTC-4 (EDT)
- ZIP Codes: 44108
- Area code: 216
- Median income: $26,434
- Source: 2020 U.S. Census, City Planning Commission of Cleveland

Glenville is a neighborhood on the East Side of Cleveland, Ohio. To the north, it borders the streetcar suburb of Bratenahl, the Cleveland Memorial Shoreway, and the Lake Erie shore, encompassing the Cleveland Lakefront Nature Preserve. To the east, it borders the suburb of East Cleveland, and to the south, it borders the neighborhoods of Hough and University Circle. Glenville borders the Collinwood area to the northeast at East 134th Street, and St. Clair–Superior to the west at Martin Luther King Jr. Boulevard and the Cleveland Cultural Gardens in Rockefeller Park.

== History ==
The Glenville neighborhood was founded in 1870 as an independent village. Until 1904, it also included the now adjacent lakeside village of Bratenahl, Ohio. Bratenahl departed from Glenville during the city of Cleveland's annexation of Glenville in 1904. In its early years, Glenville had been a small village, serving mainly as a resort community to Cleveland's upper-middle class residents. It was also home to the Glenville Race Track (harness racing) and the Cleveland Country Club. Following World War I, developers invested in Glenville with the rapid construction of single and multi-family homes throughout the Cleveland neighborhood, turning the once quiet village into a bustling inner city neighborhood.

From a period beginning shortly after its annexation in 1904 and into the 1950s, Glenville was predominantly a Jewish neighborhood with a small African American population. At its peak, Jews made up over 90% of Glenville's residents. The neighborhood's large Jewish influence during the time of its development was most notable along E.105th street, where dozens of Jewish owned stores, bakeries, kosher butchers, and other businesses lined the street. Several synagogues were built throughout the neighborhood, most of which are used today as African American churches. By the mid-1950s, the neighborhood's Jewish population began to relocate from Glenville to adjacent eastern suburbs. Similarly to surrounding inner city neighborhoods, Glenville rapidly turned into an African-American neighborhood.

In the 1960s, racial integration saw an accompanying civil unrest in the neighborhood, which reached its climax in the 1968 Glenville Shootout. Like much of the violence associated with civil unrest during the Civil Rights Movement in other major US cities as well as in the adjacent Hough neighborhood, racial tensions were a catalyst for an ensuing demographic shift.

Today, Glenville is predominantly African-American. While having been so for over a half century - being one of Cleveland's most visible examples of poverty, crime and urban decay - Glenville has in the early 21st century gained more positive national media attention, particularly in its high school football team, which has rapidly become one of the better known preparatory programs in Ohio as well as the nation.

https://rivals.com/content.asp?CID=1150869

https://n.rivals.com/content.asp?CID=1150869

== Education ==
Glenville High School and its feeder schools serve the community at large.

== Parks ==
Glenville is bordered on the northwest by Gordon Park (part of the Cleveland Lakefront State Park district) and on the entirety of its immediate western edge by the winding Rockefeller Park. Built on land donated to the city by John D. Rockefeller in 1897, the wooded 276 acres, through which a section of Martin Luther King Boulevard runs, is known for its historic greenhouse and the Cultural Gardens, and is the largest park located completely within the city limits of Cleveland.

== Notable people ==
Notable residents of Glenville include:

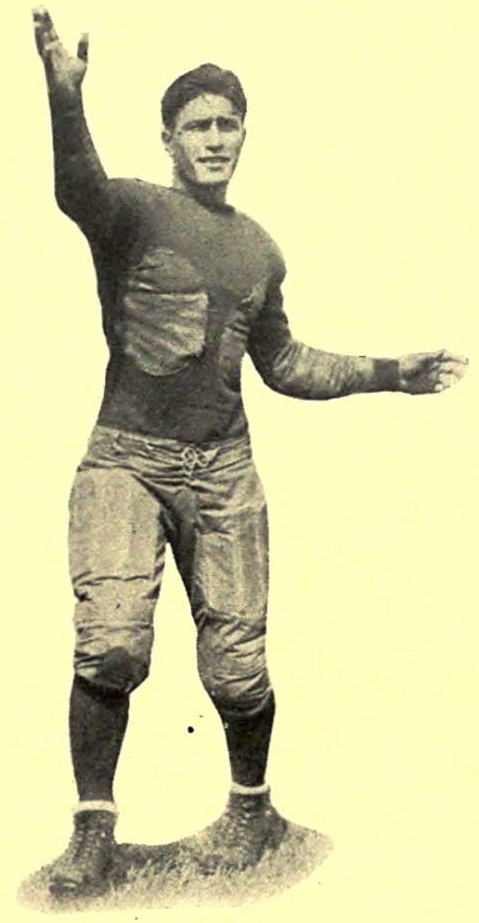
Benny Friedman

- Leon Bibb, WEWS television news anchor
- Bone Thugs-N-Harmony, Cleveland-based hip-hop/rap group
- Walter Fovargue, professional golfer and golf course architect
- Benny Friedman, NFL Hall of Fame football player and coach
- Abram Garfield, architect and son of US President James Abram Garfield
- Willie Gilbert, playwright
- Ted Ginn Jr., NFL player for New Orleans Saints
- Steve Harvey, actor and comedian
- Wilson Hirschfeld, journalist
- Cardale Jones, quarterback who led Ohio State Buckeyes to NCAA Football Championship in 2015
- Jerome Lawrence, playwright
- Hal Lebovitz, sports journalist/editor (most notably for his work in The Plain Dealer)
- Jesse Owens, famed track and field athlete who won four gold medals in the 1936 Summer Olympic Games.
- Rich Paul, sports agent
- Jerry Siegel, fanzine editor and comic book writer, co-creator of the first comic book superhero Superman.
- Joe Shuster, cartoonist and comic book artist, co-creator of the first comic book superhero Superman.
- Troy Smith, 2006 Heisman Trophy Award winner, former quarterback for the Ohio State Buckeyes, and current quarterback of the Omaha Nighthawks of the United Football League
- Donte Whitner, NFL player for the Cleveland Browns
- Michael R. White, former mayor of Cleveland, Ohio
- Pierre Woods, NFL University of Michigan linebacker and player for the New England Patriots

== See also ==
- Glenville Shootout
- Killing of Robert Godwin
- Jews and Judaism in Greater Cleveland
