= Robert Storey =

Robert Storey may refer to:

- Robert H. Storey (born 1942), Canadian bobsledder
- Robert D. Storey (born 1936), lawyer, philanthropist, university trustee, and corporate director
- Robert G. Storey (1893–1981), American lawyer at the Nuremberg trials
- Rob Storey (William Robson Storey, born 1936), New Zealand politician
- Rob Storey (Home and Away), a fictional character in the Australian soap opera Home and Away
- Bob Storey (born 1945), Canadian football player
- Bobby Storey (1956–2020), Irish republican

== See also ==
- Robert Story (disambiguation)
