= German Mennonite Peace Committee =

The German Mennonite Peace Committee, German: Deutsches Mennonitisches Friedenskomitee (DMFK), is the peace office of the Arbeitsgemeinschaft Mennonitischer Gemeinden in Deutschland (AMG). The peace office is financially supported by Mennonite congregations and interested lay persons. Its work is organized by the director, the DMFK board and various peace activists. The DMFK characterizes its vision for the world in the words "divine peace and justice taking on bodily form" (Gottes Frieden und Gerechtigkeit sollen in dieser Welt Gestalt annehmen). The DMFK works with Mennonite and other congregations, seeking to nurture peace practices as well as theological reflections on it. The current director is James (Jakob) Fehr. The offices are located in Bammental, near Heidelberg.

== History ==
The DMFK was established in 1956 as a response to the resumption of conscription in the wake of West German rearmament during the Cold War. German Mennonites saw the need to provide counsel and support to their young men in conscientious objection to military service, at a time when German conscriptors made it difficult for young men to gain CO status. The DMFK was established during a period of renewed peace witness among German Mennonites. In the aftermath of the German collapse at the end of World War II, the influence of North American Mennonites led to a recovery of the Anabaptist-Mennonite tradition and a transformation in theological thinking toward peace church theology.

During the 1980s DMFK was active in protesting the buildup of American military arms in Germany. DMFK planned and participated in protests and demonstrations. In 1986, while Mennonites were celebrating the tricentennial anniversary of the first Germans emigrating to America, the German and U.S. governments were developing close ties that led to the present military alliance of NATO. DMFK joined the protests, pointing out that good German-American relations need not be a "brotherhood in arms". DMFK informed the public that among the early emigrants to the USA were Mennonites and Quakers from Krefeld, Germany, who crossed the Atlantic to find religious freedom, including the right to refrain from military involvement.

In October 1984, DMFK established its permanent office under the leadership of Wolfgang Krauß and became active in uniting American and German peace movements. The anti-nuclear movement in Germany was particularly strong in Germany during the 1980s, some demonstrations being attended by more than 300,000 people. A human chain extended 100 km (62 mi) from Stuttgart to Neu-Ulm to protest against the new middle-range missiles that NATO and the Warsaw Pact wanted to deploy on both sides of the “Iron Curtain”. The concern that a nuclear holocaust could be imminent was widespread. The protest movement was denounced as “anti-American” by the German government. But the protesters formed their own alliance with American friends, peace groups and churches, in the conviction that transatlantic cooperation need not be guided by military prerogative. In 2003, shortly before the beginning of the Iraq War, DMFK re-established the Military Counseling Network to provide support and information to American military members stationed in Europe who were questioning their willingness to participate in warfare. DMFK ended its formal connection to Military Counseling Network in 2013.

== Current activities ==
DMFK re-organised itself in November 2007, forming a new board and new initiatives. It has offered peace theology and conflict transformation seminars for church congregations and youth groups and helps to organize and plan conferences and seminars on issues of faith and peace. It supports the Mennonitisches Friedenszentrum Berlin and the Friedenshaus Ludwigshafen in their work of encouraging Christian-Muslim dialogue and the integration of migrants into German society.

A major field of activity of the DMFK is the promotion of the work of Christian Peacemaker Teams in Germany and other parts of Europe. DMFK has organised CPT delegations to Palestine and Israel, Iraqi Kurdistan, Grassy Narrows (Canada) and Lesbos. It provides financial aid for persons wishing to complete the CPT peace trainings and is the major sponsor of Aegean Migrant Solidarity, CPT Europe's project on Lesbos which accompanies migrants and refugees on the European border.

== Michael Sattler Peace Prize ==
The Michael Sattler Peace Prize was first awarded in 2006 to mark the fiftieth anniversary of the German Mennonite Peace Committee. The Prize is named after Michael Sattler, one of the early, influential leaders of the Anabaptist movement, who was burned at the stake in Rottenburg on May 20 or 21st, 1527. The Sattler Prize was established to encourage, honour and bring attention to persons or groups who have acted in the nonviolent spirit of Sattler. The formal criteria of the prize include: "nonviolent witness to Christ, reconciliation between hostile individuals, communities, or ethnic groups, facilitating dialogue between religions and worldviews, building community of Jesus' followers and/or critiquing and resisting unjust power". Self-identifying as a Christian is not a prerequisite.

The prize is awarded approximately every three years by an ecumenical committee. Previous recipients of the Sattler Prize are:

- 2006 - Christian Peacemaker Teams
- 2007 - Tent of Nations, Bethlehem, Palestine
- 2010 - Howard Zehr, Professor of Sociology and Restorative Justice at Eastern Mennonite University
- 2013 - Judy da Silva, lay leader and peace activist of the Canadian First Nation of Grassy Narrows
- 2016 - Ekklesiyar Yan’uwa a Nigeria (the Church of the Brethren in Nigeria)

The prize in 2016 focuses on the work of CAMPI, the Christian and Muslim Peace Initiative of Ekklesiyar Yan’uwa. The EYN is based primarily in northeastern Nigeria. As the largest Christian church in the region, it suffered for years from attacks by the Islamic terror organization, Boko Haram. Of the 276 Chibok schoolgirls abducted in April 2014, the majority (178) are members of the Ekklesiyar Yan’uwa. In spite of this aggression the EYN has held fast to the peace witness of the Gospel and has renounced calls for retaliation. The Church teaches its members, and especially its youth, in the Biblical way of peace and reconciliation, and has established contact with Muslims and mosques open to dialogue.

In 2020 the prize committee announced that the next prize winner would be Lutte Pour Le Changement (LUCHA), a youth organisation in the Democratic Republic of Congo that works nonviolently for social justice. Because of the constraints imposed by the COVID-19 pandemic, the prize was postponed to 2021.
