= Paul Palnik =

American artist, writer, and educator (1946–2021)

Paul Palnik (March 28, 1946 – August 13, 2021) was an American artist, writer and educator. He was born in Cleveland, Ohio, and resided in Columbus, Ohio.

Palnik included kabbalistic spiritual themes in his cartoons from the 1970s onward. His cartoons combined graphic design, drawing, poetry, and literature. The images were pen and ink drawings, often rendered in minute detail. The cartoons were like one-page books, dispensing wit, wisdom, and spiritual advice. Palnik's cartoons have been described as being balanced between universal, spiritual, prophetic themes, and the absurd.

Many of Palnik's original drawings are in the collection of the Ohio State University libraries in Columbus, Ohio. His work is also represented in the Muse magazine cartoon collection from the publishers of The Smithsonian in Washington DC. Numerous large paintings by Palnik are in the collection of Camp Ramah in Conover, Wisconsin, where he was artist in residence for 15 years. His paintings strive to depict humanity's relationship with god.
