= André Shepherd =

U.S. Army Specialist and deserter

- Born: Cleveland, Ohio
- Military career
- Allegiance: United States of America
- Branch: United States Army (now deserted)
- Service years: 2004 – 2007
- Rank: Specialist
- Unit: 601st Aviation Support Battalion
- Conflicts: Iraq War

André Shepherd is a U.S. Army Specialist and deserter who applied for asylum in Germany on November 26, 2008. He is the first Iraq War veteran to pursue refugee status in Europe and only the second U.S. soldier to ever apply for refugee status in Germany.

== Military service in Iraq ==
After attending college Shepherd enlisted in the United States military in early 2004. He claims he was enticed by promises of financial security and international adventure. Shepherd became an Apache helicopter airframe mechanic, hoping to someday qualify up to the role of helicopter pilot. His first unit was deployed to Iraq when he completed his training. Shepherd spent six months on a forward operating base near Tikrit, working 12-hour days to keep the heavily armed Apaches (and their signature Hellfire missiles) in the air.

== Asylum seeker in Germany ==
After returning to his unit, stationed in Katterbach, Bavaria, he seriously deliberated the effects of U.S. military action on the civilian population in Iraq. "Finally I knew that if I went back, I would be responsible for the deaths and misery of others." He felt he could not apply for conscientious objection because U.S. military regulations state a conscientious objector must have an objection to all wars in all form. Shepherd's objection was not in opposition to all wars under any circumstances.

On April 11, 2007, Shepherd went Absent Without Leave (AWOL) from his Katterbach base in Germany.

Shepherd's application for asylum cited a European Union regulation providing refugee status to a soldier who is in danger of being prosecuted if military service "would include crimes or acts" which violate international law. The application refers to the Nuremberg Trials (also see Nuremberg Principles), stating "It is established that a person cannot defend his or her actions by explaining that they had simply been following orders."

Shepherd stated on the grounds of his decision: "We should not be forced to fight an illegal war, nor should we be persecuted for refusing to do so" and "During the past five years we have waged a preemptive, internationally condemned war that was shown to be founded on a series of lies. After learning the truth about the nature of my military's endeavors, I refuse to continue to be a part of this."

Shepherd's asylum application in effect asked Germany to define the US-led war in Iraq as a violation of international law, which has led to opposition from some German politicians to the application, over worry that it could harm US–German relations.

Shepherd received support from various organisations in Germany: Military Counseling Network, Connection e.V. and Iraq Veterans Against the War. He attended the anti-war event Winter Soldier: Europe that took place in Germany on March 14, 2009. Videos of the event were posted to YouTube by the IVAW.

Shepherd is currently being assisted by the German refugee detention center, asylum support groups and various sympathizers.

== Shepherd's Legal Case ==
On April 4, 2011, the German government announced that it had denied Shepherd's asylum application. On April 7, 2011, Shepherd launched an appeal against this decision. On January 23, 2013, the administrative court in Munich was supposed to hear the case. However, the hearing was cancelled and the court sent a request for a preliminary ruling to the European Court of Justice in Luxembourg for clarification on applicable European Union laws. Shepherd's appeal to the German court was stayed, pending the outcome of the European Court ruling. The European Court of Justice scheduled a public hearing regarding Shepherd's asylum application for June 25, 2014.

On November 12, 2014, Advocate General Eleanor V.E. Sharpston of the European Court of Justice advised that Shepherd had the right to claim asylum in the European Union despite the fact that he was a non-combat helicopter mechanic. She further advised that it was for the German court to decide whether the punishment that Mr. Shepherd would face if convicted of desertion in the U.S. would count as an act of persecution. She also advised that the German court would need to determine whether there was a reasonable likelihood of Shepherd being involved in war crimes, if he were deployed to a conflict zone, without needing to establish that fact beyond reasonable doubt.

On February 25, 2015, the European Court of Justice ruled in line with Advocate General Sharpston's opinion. The court held that, while it is possible Shepherd could seek asylum in Germany, he would have to prove that he would have been involved in war crimes and that deserting was his only option to avoid committing such crimes. The ECJ left that finding to German courts to decide, as well as whether the prosecution Shepherd could face under the Uniform Code of Military Justice of the U.S. actually amounted to persecution. Shepherd's case returned to the German court for its decision.

== Public Discussion and Honours ==
On February 7, 2009, André Shepherd was awarded the Peace Prize "Peace through Conviction" of the Munich American Peace Committee. The award was presented in the context of protest activities against the Munich Conference on Security Policy. The national newspaper Die Tageszeitung awarded Shepherd its taz Panter Prize in 2010. He was also awarded the Human Rights Prize of Pro Asyl in 2015.

The German Greenpeace magazine reported in its February 2009 edition about this asylum case.

== See also ==
- The Military Counseling Network
- Nuremberg Principles
