= Friedrich Siegmund-Schultze =

German academic and pastor

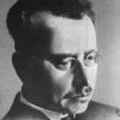
Friedrich Siegmund-Schultze

Friedrich Siegmund-Schultze (14 June 1885, Görlitz – 11 July 1969, Soest) was a German academic working in theology, social pedagogy and social ethics, as well as a pioneer of peace movements.

== Life ==
After studying at several gymnasia, Siegmund-Schultze studied philosophy and theology in Breslau and Magdeburg. In 1908 he became the secretary of the "Church Committee for friendly relations between Great Britain and Germany" (Kirchlichen Komitees zur Pflege freundschaftlicher Beziehungen zwischen Großbritannien und Deutschland) and later secretary to the "World Christian Student League for social work and foreign mission" (Christlichen Studentenweltbundes für Sozialarbeit und Ausländermission).

In 1911 he and his wife founded the "Soziale Arbeitergemeinschaft Berlin-Ost" (SAG). Its offices were shut down after the Nazi seizure of power. At the World Churches Conference in Konstanz from 1 to 3 August 1914, just before the outbreak of war, he was secretary and co-founder of the "Weltbundes für Freundschaftsarbeit der Kirchen". He formed a pact with his fellow-delegate English Quaker Henry Hodgkin (meeting on the platform of the railway station at Cologne, they pledged to each other that, "We are one in Christ and can never be at war") that led to the formation of the Fellowship of Reconciliation and the International Fellowship of Reconciliation.

During the First World War he organised Gefangenenseelsorge for British and German prisoners of war. Through his contacts with the Quakers and with the "Versöhnungsbund" (reconciliation alliance), he and Elisabeth Rotten organised Quaker meals for schoolchildren in Berlin. In 1915 he met the Dutch pacifist Kees Boeke in Berlin. October 1918 the founder of ecumenism, archbishop Nathan Söderblom, invited him to give a guest lecture on "The social renewal of Christianity and the unity of the Church" at Uppsala University.

In 1925 Siegmund-Schultze received the professorship in "Jugendkunde und Jugendwohlfahrt" (and later in "Sozialpädagogik und Sozialethik") at the University of Berlin. In spring 1933 he joined the foundation of an international aid-committee for German-Jewish refugees. The Nazis arrested him (on 93 charges of "racial help"). He was expelled from Germany under Gestapobegleitung in 1933 with his wife and four children. They went to live in Switzerland and he was active there in student chaplaincy and as a guest lecturer until 1946.

In 1947 he was made professor of "Sozialpädagogik und Sozialethik" at the Westfälischen Wilhelms-Universitat at Münster. In 1948 he founded the "Jugend-Wohlfahrtsschule Dortmund", and was its head until 1954. He was a founding member of the 'Central Office for the Law and Protection of Conscientious Objectors' in 1957. In 1958 he founded the Ecumenical Archive (Ökumenische Archiv) in Soest. It later received the central archive of the EKD in Berlin.

Siegmund-Schultze was friends with Albert Schweitzer and published the Ökumenischen Jahrbuchs.

== The Friedrich Siegmund-Schultze Förderpreis ==
The Friedrich Siegmund Schultze Prize for Nonviolent Action is named after him. The prize was created in 1994. Winners include;

- 1994 das Antikriegszentrum Belgrad
- 1995 German section of Peace Brigades International
- 1998 Yesh Gvul
- 2001 Connection e.V.
- 2004 War Resisters' International
- 2008 Military Counseling Network sowie Dorf der Freundschaft
- 2014 Combatants for Peace
- 2018 Peace Service EIRENE
- 2020 Arbeitskreis der Universität Köln für die Zivilklauselbewegung & Evangelische Studierendengemeinde Leipzig

== Works ==
- Ökumenisches Jahrbuch 1934–1935, Zürich/Leipzig 1936; Ökumenisches Jahrbuch 1936–1937, Zürich und Leipzig 1939;
- Ekklesia 1934–1935, Leipold Klotz Verlag, Gotha

== See also ==
- List of peace activists
