= Conover (community), Wisconsin =

Conover, Wisconsin
- Unincorporated community
- Location within Wisconsin Location within the United States
- Coordinates: 46°03′17″N 89°15′28″W
- Country: United States
- State: Wisconsin
- County: Vilas
- Elevation: 1,657 ft (505 m)
- Time zone: UTC-6 (Central (CST))
  - Summer (DST): UTC-5 (CDT)
- ZIP Code: 54519
- Area codes: 715 & 534
- GNIS feature ID: 1579036

Conover is an unincorporated community located in the town of Conover, Vilas County, Wisconsin, United States. Conover is located on U.S. Route 45 and Wisconsin Highway 32, 9.5 miles (15.3 km) north of Eagle River. Conover has a post office with the ZIP Code 54519.

== History ==
A post office called Conover has been in operation since 1894. The community was named for Seth H. Conover, a local hotel owner.
