= Richard Bishop (gridiron football) =

American gridiron football player (1950–2016)

No. 64, 72, 65
- Position: Defensive lineman

Personal information
- Born: March 23, 1950; Cleveland, Ohio, U.S.
- Died: September 26, 2016 (aged 66); Miami, Florida, U.S.
- Listed height: 6 ft 1 in (1.85 m)
- Listed weight: 260 lb (118 kg)

Career information
- High school: Glenville (OH)
- College: Marshalltown Community College; Louisville
- NFL draft: 1974: 5th round, 127 (By the Cincinnati Bengals)th overall pick

Career history
- 1974–1975: Hamilton Tiger-Cats
- 1975: Ottawa Rough Riders
- 1976–1981: New England Patriots
- 1982: Miami Dolphins
- 1983: Los Angeles Rams
- Stats at Pro Football Reference

Richard Allen Bishop (March 23, 1950 – September 26, 2016) was an American professional football player who was a defensive tackle in the National Football League (NFL) and Canadian Football League (CFL). He played college football at Marshalltown Community College in Marshalltown, Iowa, where he was a First-team NJCAA All-American as a defensive end. Following his career at Marshalltown, Bishop played at the University of Louisville for the Louisville Cardinals. He died in Miami, Florida, in 2016.

Bishop recorded 30.5 sacks, recovered 6 fumbles and blocked a field goal attempt while playing on the defensive line for the New England Patriots over the 1976–1981 seasons in the NFL. He was a member of the New England Patriots 1980s All-Decade Team. He shared in a sack of Ken Stabler and Dan Manucci, recorded 1 sack of Mike Rae, Ron Jaworski, Ken Anderson, Scott Hunter, Greg Landry, Matt Robinson, Marc Wilson, David Woodley and 1 1/2 sacks of Dan Fouts. He had 2 sacks of Joe Ferguson and Jack Thompson and 3 sacks of Pro Football Hall of Famer Bob Griese. He recorded 5 sacks of Bert Jones and 8 sacks of Jets QB Richard Todd. Bishop recovered fumbles by Terry Bradshaw, Mike Hogan, John Riggins, Joe Washington and Richard Todd. He blocked a 40-yard field goal attempt by Mark Moseley in the Patriots 24–22 loss to the Washington Redskins on October 25, 1981. He recorded one safety when he sacked Bob Griese in the Patriots 33–24 win over Miami on October 22, 1978. Bishop participated in 3 sacks of Dan Pastorini in the Patriots 31–14 Divisional Playoff Game loss to Houston on December 31, 1978.
