= Military Counseling Network =

The Military Counseling Network (MCN) is a non-profit GI Rights organization dedicated to being a free source of information to U.S military members concerning military regulations and discharges, with an emphasis on working with those members who are looking to apply for a conscientious objection discharge. The Network is a project of the German Mennonite Peace Committee (Deutsches Mennonitisches Friedenskomitee, DMFK) and is located in Bammental, Germany, in the DMFK offices. MCN is part of the GI Rights Network.

MCN exists as a source of information concerning a wide range of regulations and discharges, such as conscientious objection, medical, and hardship to U.S military members stationed in Europe. Counselors do not provide legal advice, but can assist callers in finding lawyers in their area who can give them appropriate advice.

== History ==
In September 1986, Bill Boston created the ‘Military Counseling Project – Mutlangen' in West Germany, offering an independent source of information about GI rights and discharge possibilities for US servicemembers. In the Fall of 1987, Janice Hill and Andre Gingerich Stoner joined with Boston and created the Military Counseling Network.

The first mission statement read:

Presently more than 250,000 members of the US military and their families and US civilian employees are stationed in the Federal Republic of Germany. Many of them suffer violations of rights and face conflicts of conscience and other difficulties within the military.

The Military Counseling Network advises US soldiers free of charge about their rights under military law and can assist them in achieving various discharges (conscientious objection, medical, hardship, etc.). The network of trained civilian counselors was established because soldiers are often poorly informed of their rights and until now had no source of assistance in Germany outside of the military.

The network also seeks to build bridges and foster dialogue between US soldiers and the German population in order to break down stereotypes and prejudices. MCN counselors are committed to the principles of nonviolence. The network works in close cooperation with European, American, and international human rights, peace, church, and women's groups.

Through trainings in cooperation with the Central Committee for Conscientious Objectors (CCCO), the network expanded and included counselors in Berlin, Frankfurt, Mutlangen, Heilbronn, Tübingen, and Hunsrück. All of the counselors contributed on a voluntary, part-time basis, while continuing in their other jobs until August 1990, when MCN officially closed due to financial struggles and a number of counselors leaving the area.

Later that month, however, Iraq invaded Kuwait, and the US military build-up in the Middle East began. Over 100,000 US troops were deployed from Europe, and the need for MCN rose. During this time, MCNs' caseload increased, and counselors were even brought over from the US to help with the counseling. By mid-1995, however, MCN was disbanded as a coordinated organization after a decrease in case load.

In 2003, as the United States prepared for another war in the Middle East, David Stutzman saw the reemerging need for military counseling. With the help of the Mennonite Central Committee, Connection e.V, and Ohne Rüstung Leben, MCN was re-founded as a project of the Deutsches Mennonitisches Friedenskomitee (the German Mennonite Peace Committee) 17 days before the War in Iraq began. Since 2004, when the Mennonite Mission Network also came on as a supporting partner, there have been two full-time personnel in the office.

== Awards ==
2008 Friedrich Siegmund-Schultze-Förderpreis (Friedrich-Siegmund Schultze Prize for Nonviolent Action)
