= Robert Story =

Robert Story may refer to:

- Robert Story (poet) (1795–1860), English poet
- Robert Story (minister) (1790–1859), Scottish minister
- Robert Herbert Story (1835–1907), Scottish minister
- Robert Story (politician) (born 1952), American politician
- Robert Story (botanist) (1913–1999), South African botanist

== See also ==
- Robert Storey (disambiguation)
