= Podcerkev =

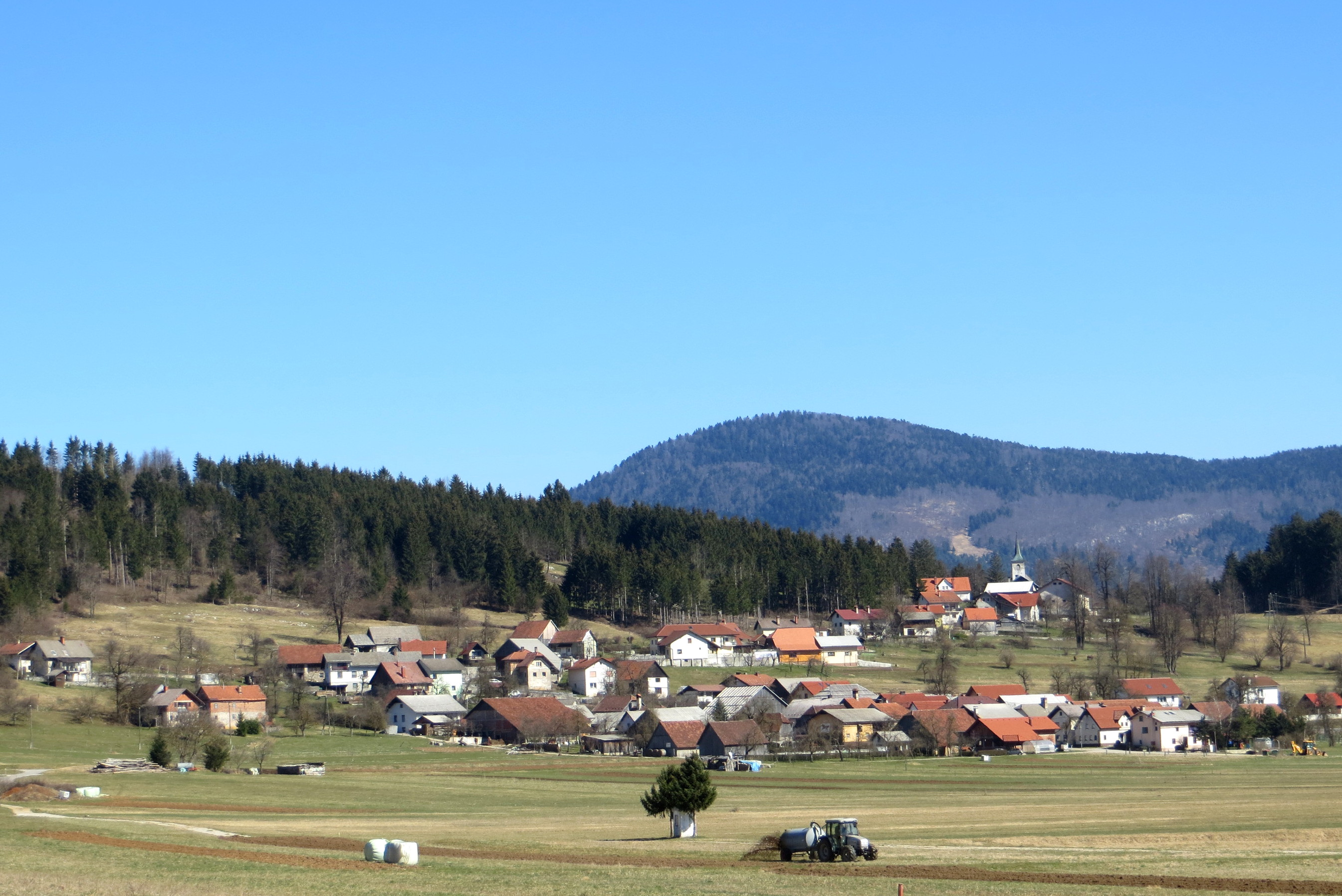

- Location in Slovenia
- Coordinates: 45°42′42.71″N 14°27′28.65″E
- Country: Slovenia
- Traditional region: Inner Carniola
- Statistical region: Littoral–Inner Carniola
- Municipality: Loška Dolina

Area
  - Total: 5.68 km^{2} (2.19 sq mi)
- Elevation: 579.2 m (1,900 ft)

Population (2002)
  - Total: 133

Podcerkev (pronounced [pɔˈtseːɾkəu̯] or [pɔtsɛɾˈkəu̯], German: Podzirku) is a village west of Stari Trg pri Ložu in the Municipality of Loška Dolina in the Inner Carniola region of Slovenia.

== Name ==
Podcerkev was attested in written sources as Podcirco in 1360 and as Podczirkg in 1468. The name is a fused prepositional phrase that has lost inflection, a compound of pod 'below' + cerkev 'church', thus meaning 'below the church'. The settlement lies about 31 meters (102 ft) below the village church.

== Church ==
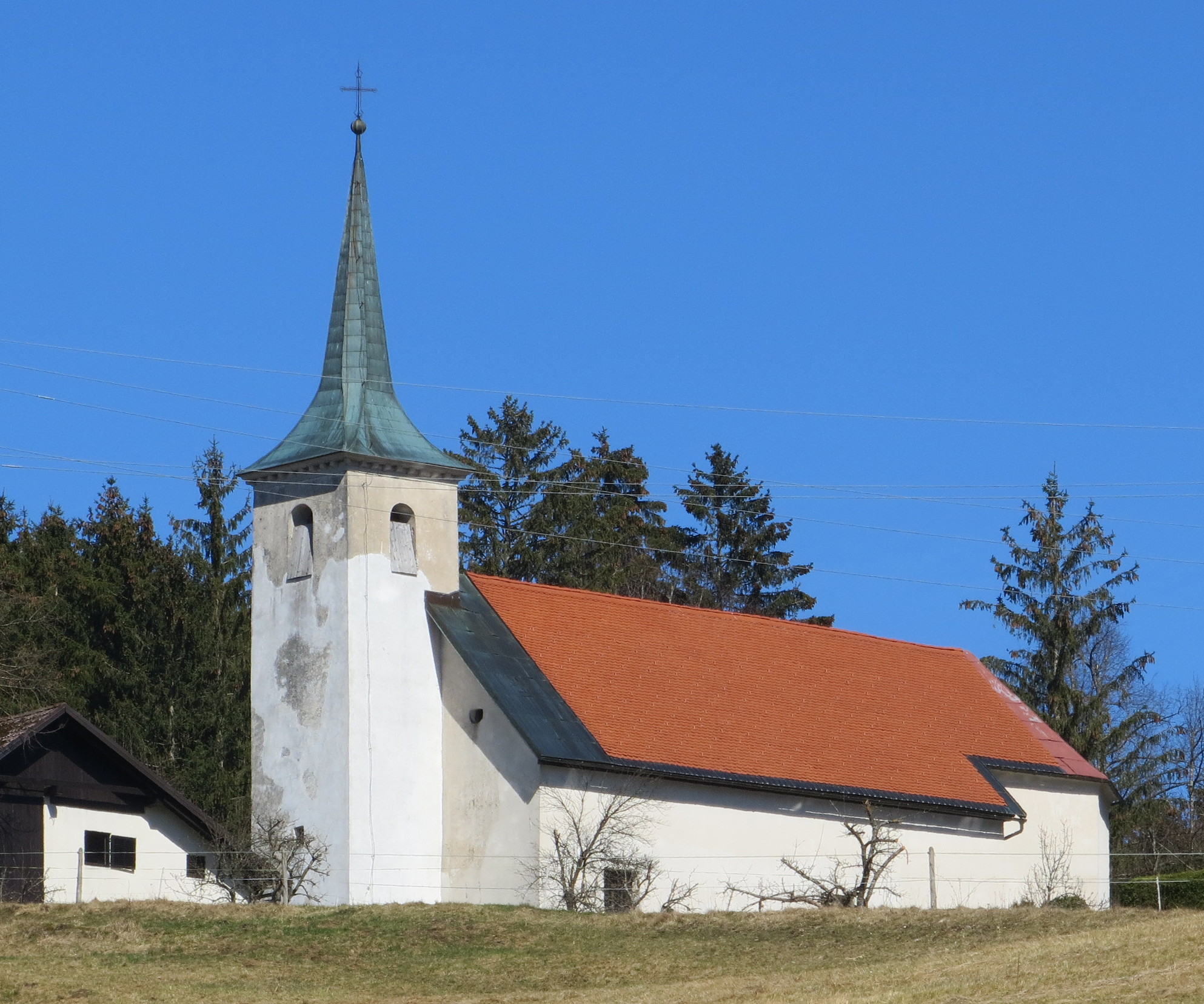
Saint Martin's Church

The local church in the settlement is dedicated to Saint Martin and belongs to the Parish of Stari Trg.

== Notable people ==
Notable people that were born or lived in Podcerkev include:

- Matija Škerbec (1886–1963), Roman Catholic priest, political figure, and writer
