= Donn Greenshields =

American football player (1904–1961)

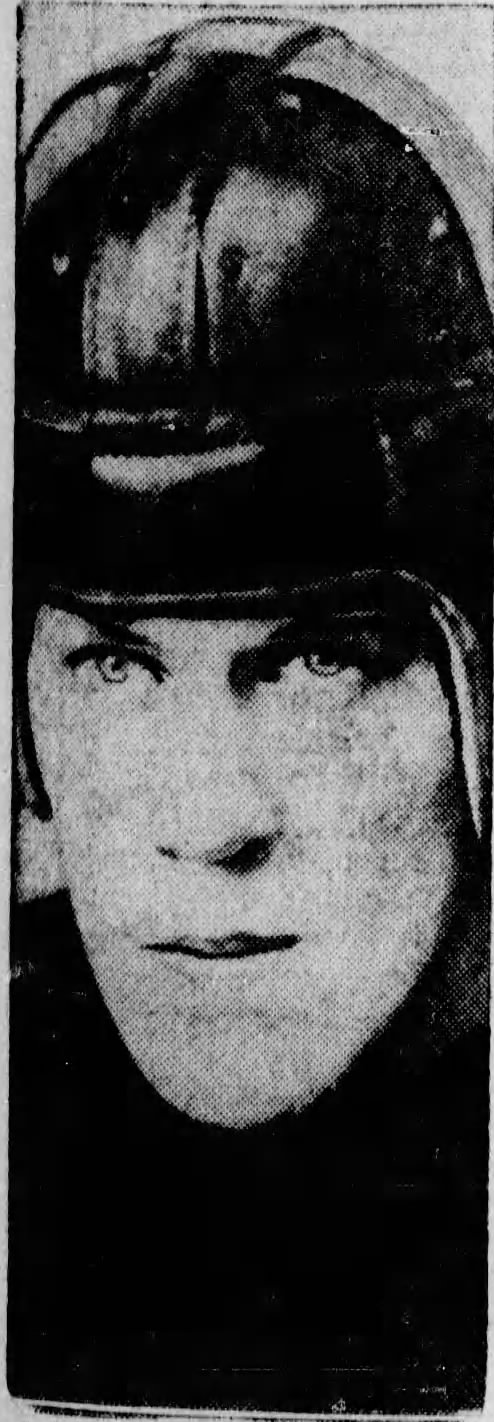
- Greenshields in 1928

Profile
- Position: Tackle

Personal information
- Born: May 1, 1904; Cleveland, Ohio
- Died: March 28, 1961 (aged 56); Fox Chapel, Pennsylvania
- Listed height: 6 ft 1 in (1.85 m)
- Listed weight: 190 lb (86 kg)

Career information
- High school: Glenville (OH)
- College: Penn State

Career history
- Brooklyn Dodgers (1932–1933)
- Stats at Pro Football Reference

Donn D. Greenshields (May 1, 1904 – March 28, 1961) was an American football player. He played college football for Penn State (1926–1928) and professional football in the National Football League (NFL) for the Brooklyn Dodgers (1932–1933).

== Early life ==
Greenshields was born in Cleveland in 1904. He attended Glenville High School where he was teammates with Benny Friedman on the 1922 football team that won the greater Cleveland championship.

== Penn State ==
He enrolled at Penn State in 1924 and played that fall with the freshman football team. He left the school in 1925 but returned in 1926. He played for the Penn State varsity football teams from 1926 to 1928, playing at the tackle position. He was selected as captain of the 1928 team. He was the first tackle to serve as a Penn State captain since 1900.

== NFL career ==
He then played professional football in the National Football League (NFL) as a tackle for the Brooklyn Dodgers. He was reunited with high school teammate Benny Friedman as players on the Dodgers. He appeared in 13 NFL games, eight as a starter, during the 1932 and 1933 seasons.

== Screw business ==
After retiring from football, Greenshields went into the screw business. He was employed, eventually as a vice president and director, of National Screw and Manufacturing Co. in Cleveland for 20 years. In 1955, he became president of The Pittsburgh Screw & Bolt Co. He remained with the company as it changed its name to Screw & Bolt Corp. of America. He resigned as president in February 1961.

== Death ==
One month after his resignation, he was discovered dead in his automobile in the closed garage at his home in Fox Chapel, Pennsylvania, having expired from carbon monoxide poisoning. He was 57 years old at the time of his death. He was reportedly despondent after the death of his wife five months earlier. Police stated that the death was apparently a suicide.
