= Deviant Ways =

1995 book by Richard Montanari

Deviant Ways is a novel by Richard Montanari published by Signet in 1995.

== Plot summary ==
Deviant Ways is a novel in which experienced detective Jack Paris investigates the brutal murders of young women.

== Reception ==
Richard Jones reviewed Deviant Ways for Arcane magazine, rating it a 4 out of 10 overall. Jones comments that "Admittedly there are a few points where Montanan injects a degree of tension and where his prose style works to dramatic effect. But the lasting impression this book leaves is of some fairly gruesome detail added to a very average detective/fantasy yarn. The cover boasts that Deviant Ways is 'kinky, realistic, scary as hell and absolutely great'. It's not."

Kirkus Reviews states that the book is "A lively, if inelegant, tour of the underbelly."

Publishers Weekly states: "The narrative may feature plenty of explicit sex and violence, but the motives for the killers' murder rituals remain inadequately explained, as do the psychodynamics of their relationship, making this more an exercise in sensationalism than in sound storytelling."
