= Aubrey Hirsch =

American writer and illustrator

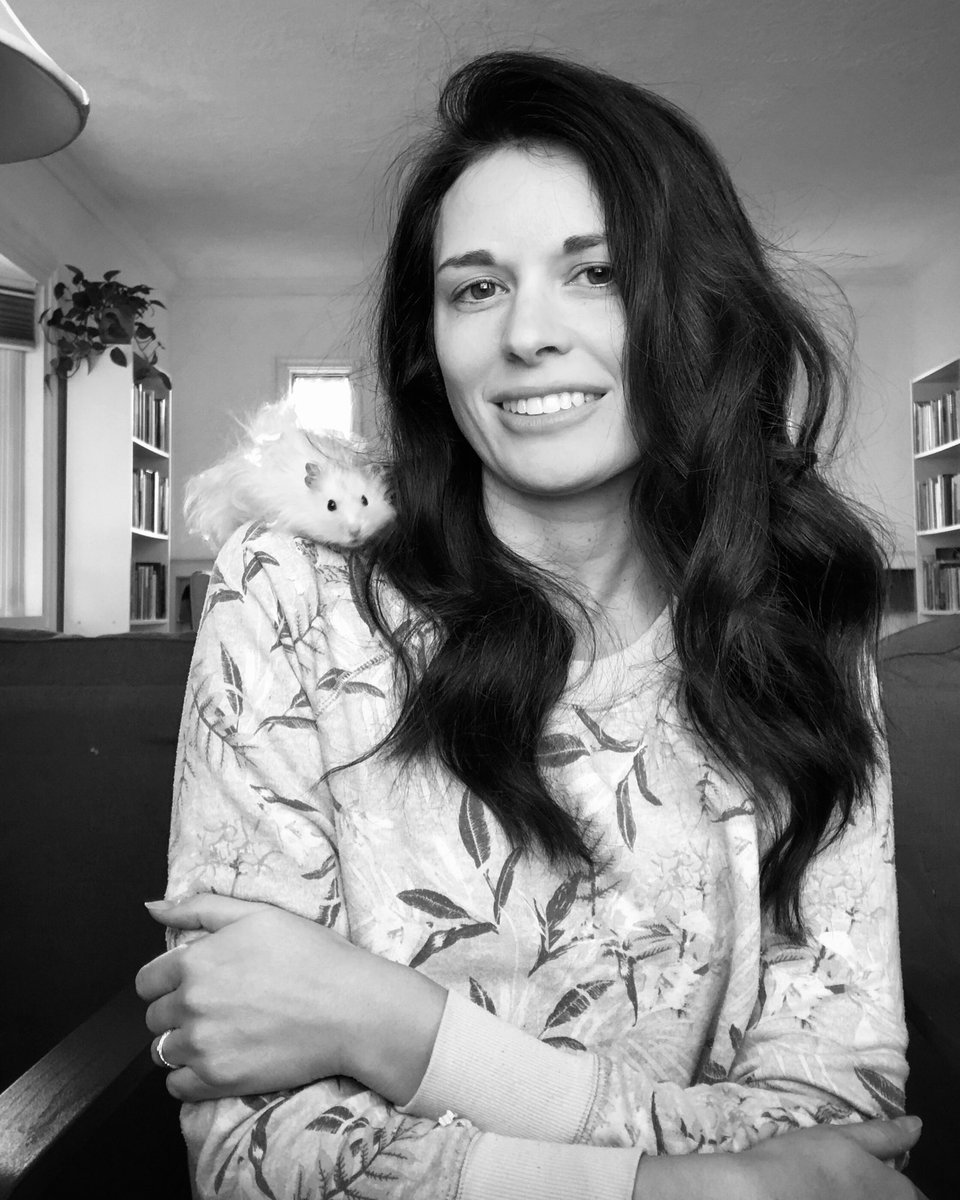
Aubrey Hirsch with her hamster, French Fries

Aubrey Hirsch is a writer and illustrator from Cleveland, Ohio, who has published personal essays and comics in the New York Times, Time Magazine, Vox, The Nib, and elsewhere. She published a short story collection, Why We Never Talk About Sugar, in 2013, and her essays and stories have been published in anthologies and collections, including Roxane Gay's Not That Bad: Dispatches from Rape Culture, Ways of Reading: An Anthology for Writers, and Pittsburgh Noir. Hirsch is a 2022 National Endowment for the Arts Fellow in Creative Writing and a 2022 Sustainable Arts Foundation award winner for graphic memoir.

Hirsch's essays and comics explore gender equality, parenting, sexuality, friendship, public health, and other social equity issues. She has written about being subjected to threats and internet harassment because of her public feminism and advocacy for marginalized communities.
