= Conover, Wisconsin =

- Town
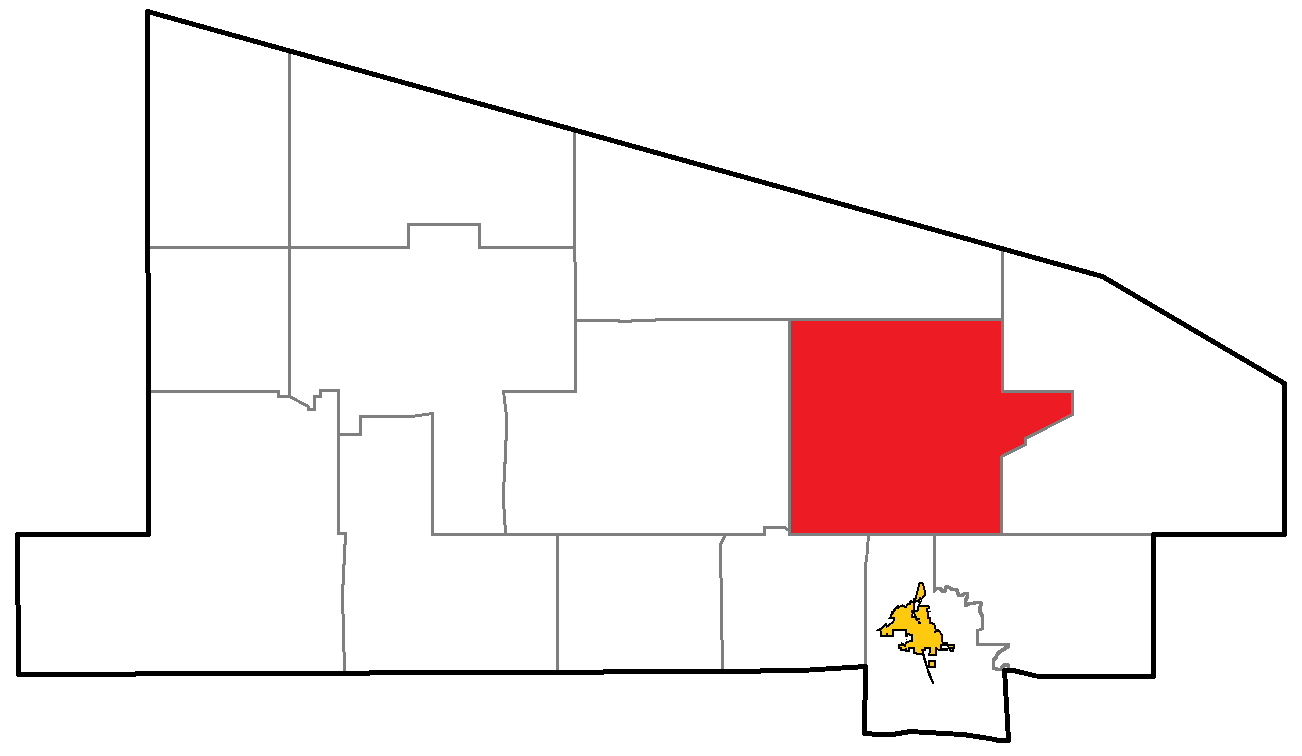
- Location of Conover, within Vilas County
- Coordinates: 46°03′17″N 89°15′28″W
- Country: United States
- State: Wisconsin
- County: Vilas

Area
  - Total: 87.2 sq mi (225.8 km^{2})
  - Land: 80.0 sq mi (207.1 km^{2})
  - Water: 7.2 sq mi (18.7 km^{2})
- Elevation: 1,654 ft (504 m)

Population (2020)
  - Total: 1,318
  - Density: 16.48/sq mi (6.364/km^{2})
- Time zone: UTC−6 (Central (CST))
  - Summer (DST): UTC−5 (CDT)
- Area codes: 715 & 534
- FIPS code: 55-16750
- GNIS feature ID: 1583010

Conover is a town in Vilas County, Wisconsin, United States. The population was 1,318 at the 2020 census. The unincorporated community of Conover is located in the town.

== History ==
The town is named after Seth H. Conover, a descendant of Wolfert Gerritse van Couwenhoven, who would travel to the area for hunting and fishing. He would often take a train to the area, even though there was no station there. Eventually, the railroad men started calling the area "Conover's Place." A station was soon built there, and several logging camps were established. The town continued to grow when other businesses were established. In 1935, the town hall was built.

== Geography ==
The Town of Conover is located in central Vilas County. The upper part of the Wisconsin River flows through the town, and there are several lakes that dot the area. Much of the western part of the town is made up of Vilas County Forest lands. According to the United States Census Bureau, the town has a total area of 87.2 square miles (225.8 km^{2}), of which 80.0 square miles (207.1 km^{2}) is land and 7.2 square miles (18.7 km^{2}) (8.27%) is water.

== Demographics ==
As of the census of 2000, there were 1,137 people, 483 households, and 337 families residing in the town. The population density was 14.2 people per square mile (5.5/km^{2}). There were 1,440 housing units at an average density of 18.0 per square mile (7.0/km^{2}). The racial makeup of the town was 98.77% White, 0.35% African American, 0.26% Native American, 0.18% Asian, 0.09% from other races, and 0.35% from two or more races. Hispanic or Latino of any race were 0.70% of the population.

There were 483 households, out of which 24.8% had children under the age of 18 living with them, 61.1% were married couples living together, 5.6% had a female householder with no husband present, and 30.2% were non-families. 24.6% of all households were made up of individuals, and 10.6% had someone living alone who was 65 years of age or older. The average household size was 2.35 and the average family size was 2.82.

In the town, the population was spread out, with 21.9% under the age of 18, 3.5% from 18 to 24, 25.1% from 25 to 44, 29.1% from 45 to 64, and 20.4% who were 65 years of age or older. The median age was 44 years. For every 100 females, there were 104.9 males. For every 100 females age 18 and over, there were 103.7 males.

The median income for a household in the town was $31,683, and the median income for a family was $37,125. Males had a median income of $31,563 versus $23,750 for females. The per capita income for the town was $18,692. About 7.1% of families and 8.5% of the population were below the poverty line, including 8.5% of those under age 18 and 2.5% of those age 65 or over.

== Transportation ==
Conover is served by USH 45 and STH 32, which run concurrently north–south through the middle of the town. To the north the highways run to Land o' Lakes and on into the Upper Peninsula of Michigan. To the south they connect to Eagle River and points south. STH 17 also serves a small portion of the southeast corner of the town as it makes its way between Eagle River and Phelps. There are two Vilas County Highways that serve the Town of Conover. CTH K runs east–west through the center of town, meeting USH45\STH32 in the unincorporated community of Conover. CTH K runs east along the north shore of North Twin Lakes and connects to CTH E and the community of Phelps. It proceeds east through the Vilas County Forest towards Star Lake and eventually Boulder Junction. CTH S runs from a junction with CTH K near Stormy Lake northwards into the Town of Land o' Lakes and serves the area around the Tamarack Flowage. The Vilas County forest lands and roads are also home to many snowmobile trails in the winter, with trails leading to all the surrounding communities.

== Recreation ==
Vilas County forest lands cover much of the Town of Conover, allowing for opportunities to camp, fish, and hike. The Wisconsin River runs north–south through the center of the town and is popular with canoeists and kayakers. Every summer the Callie Rohr Memorial Canoe and Kayak charity race is held on the river. Camp Ramah in Wisconsin is located in Conover on the shore of Upper Buckatabon Lake, approximately 18 miles (29 km) north of Eagle River and 5 miles (8.0 km) southwest of the unincorporated community of Conover.

== Climate ==
The climate is described as Humid Continental by the Köppen Climate System, abbreviated as Dfb.

Climate data for Conover, Wisconsin
Month	Jan	Feb	Mar	Apr	May	Jun	Jul	Aug	Sep	Oct	Nov	Dec	Year
Mean daily maximum °F (°C)	18.9 (−7.3)	21.9 (−5.6)	34.3 (1.3)	46.0 (7.8)	63.1 (17.3)	72.1 (22.3)	76.6 (24.8)	74.5 (23.6)	66.7 (19.3)	50.2 (10.1)	36.3 (2.4)	23.9 (−4.5)	48.7 (9.3)
Mean daily minimum °F (°C)	7.9 (−13.4)	9.1 (−12.7)	20.7 (−6.3)	30 (−1)	42.4 (5.8)	50.9 (10.5)	56.1 (13.4)	54.7 (12.6)	48.0 (8.9)	38.3 (3.5)	26.4 (−3.1)	14.9 (−9.5)	33.3 (0.7)
Average precipitation inches (mm)	1.08 (27.5)	1.30 (32.9)	1.87 (47.4)	4.02 (102.2)	3.70 (94.0)	4.44 (112.8)	3.91 (99.3)	3.94 (100.1)	3.68 (93.4)	4.30 (109.2)	2.26 (57.4)	2.03 (51.5)	36.53 (927.7)
Average snowfall inches (cm)	9.3 (23.6)	9.6 (24.5)	6.8 (17.2)	8.3 (21.2)	0.7 (1.8)	0 (0)	0 (0)	0 (0)	0 (0)	1.9 (4.7)	7.0 (17.9)	9.7 (24.6)	53.3 (135.5)
Average rainy days	2.8	3.1	7.4	12.4	15.3	15.8	15.3	15.2	12.1	12.4	7.1	4.6	123.5
Average relative humidity (%)	92	92	87	79	71	75	76	79	80	80	82	90	82
Mean monthly sunshine hours	62	56.5	127.1	192	260.4	270	300.7	279	228	136.4	105	71.3	2,088.4
Mean daily sunshine hours	2	2	4.1	6.4	8.4	9	9.7	9	7.6	4.4	3.5	2.3	5.7
Mean daily daylight hours	9.1	10.4	12	13.6	15	15.7	15.3	14.1	12.5	10.9	9.5	8.7	12.2
Average ultraviolet index	1	1	1	2	4	5	5	4	3	2	1	1	3
Source 1: Weather Atlas
Source 2: World Weather online (precipitation & UV 2009–2023)
