= Michelangelo Lovelace =

Self-taught painter from Cleveland, Ohio

- Born: June 15, 1960; Cleveland, Ohio
- Died: April 26, 2021 (aged 60); Cleveland, Ohio

Michelangelo Lovelace (1960–2021) was a self-taught artist who painted urban scenes inspired by his lifelong home, Cleveland, Ohio. He was born Michael Anthony Lovelace on June 15, 1960, and grew up in the King Kennedy public housing complex in the Central neighborhood of Cleveland. After being arrested at age 19 for selling marijuana, he was encouraged by the judge to create art.

== Early life and career ==
He later studied at the Cleveland Institute of Art in 1984, although he dropped out. He moved into the Hodge artist complex in Cleveland in 1990, where he focused on paintings of city street life. In his late 20s, he legally took the name Michelangelo.

His first solo show was in 1991 at Ujima Studio Gallery in Los Angeles, California. His art frequently depicted the people and places on the urban margins, with Black identity, injustice, policing, drugs, and poverty common themes. He used vibrant color to paint dense scenes of billboards, storefronts, and neighborhoods. Alongside his painting career, he worked for 30 years as nurse’s aide, and in 2020, he had an online solo show with the New York-based Fort Gansevoort gallery of his portraits of nursing home residents that he had started making in the 1990s.

In 2015, he received the Cleveland Arts Prize for Mid-Career Artist. He died on April 26, 2021, of pancreatic cancer.

In May 2024, the Akron Art Museum opened a major retrospective on his career.
