= Kristina Cho =

American cookbook author and blogger

- Born: Cleveland
- Alma mater: University of Cincinnati
- Occupation: Writer, blogger
- Awards: James Beard Foundation Award (2022)
- Website: eatchofood.com

Kristina Cho is a James Beard Award winning cookbook author, food blogger, and content creator. Her first cookbook, Mooncakes and Milk Bread: Sweet and Savory Recipes Inspired by Chinese Bakeries, won two James Beard awards. She also runs the popular food blog and Instagram page, Eat Cho Food.

== Early life ==
Cho was born in Cleveland, Ohio to Wai Tai and Wanda Cho. She has a brother named Tyler. Her grandparents immigrated from Hong Kong in the late 1960s and began working in restaurants. Eventually, they opened their own Chinese restaurant, which became the family business. As a child, Cho recalls doing homework at the counter and spending time at the restaurant. She credits this as a space that sparked her passion for food and made her interested in a cooking-related career. Cho began baking on her own when she was 13 years old.

== Career ==
In college, Cho majored in architecture at the University of Cincinnati and pursued a career in that field before switching to food. In 2014, she moved to San Francisco after getting an architecture internship, but found the work to be unfulfilling.

In 2017, Cho began her blog, Eat Cho Food, where she shares recipes for baked goods, entrees, and more. She consistently worked on the blog, sharing a recipe each week, amassed a considerable following, and ended up quitting her full-time job in 2019. Shortly after Cho quit, she received an email from her literary agent suggesting that she write a book.

Cho released her debut cookbook, Mooncakes and Milk Bread: Sweet and Savory Recipes Inspired by Chinese Bakeries, in 2021. The book is one of the first modern English language cookbooks to cover Chinese baking. As Cho was developing the book, she found a distinct lack of books or articles around Chinese bakery culture and recipes, which inspired her to provide holistic coverage of these bakeries. She conducted interviews with four Chinese bakeries throughout the country to include in the book.

The New York Times and The New Yorker named Cho's book as one of the top 10 cookbooks of 2021. Time Out, Glamour, and Taste of Home also named it one of the best cookbooks of 2021.

In 2022, Cho won two James Beard Awards in the baking book and dessert book categories.

In 2024, Cho's second cookbook, Chinese Enough: Homestyle Recipes for Noodles, Dumplings, Stir-Fries and More, was released. It was nominated for a 2025 James Beard Award in the U.S. Foodways category.
