= Glenville High School =

Public coeducational high school in Cleveland, Ohio

- Glenville High School 1966

Location
- 650 East 113th Street; Cleveland, Cuyahoga County, Ohio 44108; United States; 41°32′21″N 81°36′24″W

Information
- Type: Public, Coeducational high school
- Established: 1892
- Superintendent: Dr. Warren Morgan
- NCES School ID: 390437800468
- Principal: Jacqueline Bell, Latonia Davis
- Faculty: 26.00 (on an FTE basis)
- Grades: 9–12
- Enrollment: 339 (2024–2025)
- Student to teacher ratio: 13.04
- Colors: Red and black
- Athletics conference: Senate League
- Team name: Tarblooders
- Accreditation: North Central Association of Colleges and Schools
- Website: https://glenville.clevelandmetroschools.org/

Glenville High School is a public high school in Glenville neighborhood of Cleveland, Ohio and part of the Cleveland Metropolitan School District. Athletic teams are known as the Tarblooders and the compete in the Ohio High School Athletic Association as a member of the Senate Athletic League.

== History ==
Glenville's first high school was opened in 1892 on Parkwood Drive. Rapid enrollment growth led to the opening of a new high school, later built in 1904. The village of Glenville was annexed by Cleveland in 1906, making the high school a part of the Cleveland public school system. During the early 20th century Glenville High School reflected the changing character of its surrounding neighborhood. As Jewish families moved from Cleveland’s Woodland area into Glenville, the school’s student body became predominantly Jewish, reportedly reaching about 90 percent at one point. In the decades after World War II, demographic changes in the neighborhood transformed the school again, and Glenville became an important center of African American education and community life on Cleveland’s East Side.

Because of continued growth, the original Parkwood building eventually became overcrowded despite several additions. Funding for a replacement facility was approved in the early 1960s, and a new Glenville High School building opened in 1966 at 650 East 113th Street. The newer campus included updated academic spaces, science facilities, and a large gymnasium built to serve the school’s sizable student population.

== Athletics ==
=== State championships ===
- Football - 2022, 2023, 2025
- Boys track and field - 1959, 1960, 1965, 1966, 1967, 1968, 1970, 1973, 1974, 1975, 2003, 2004, 2005, 2006, 2007, 2014, 2022, 2023, 2026

== Notable alumni ==
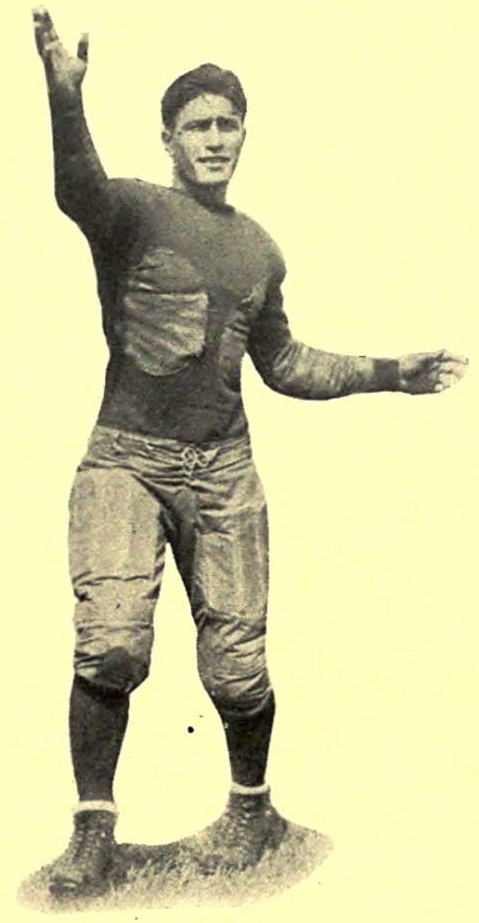
Benny Friedman

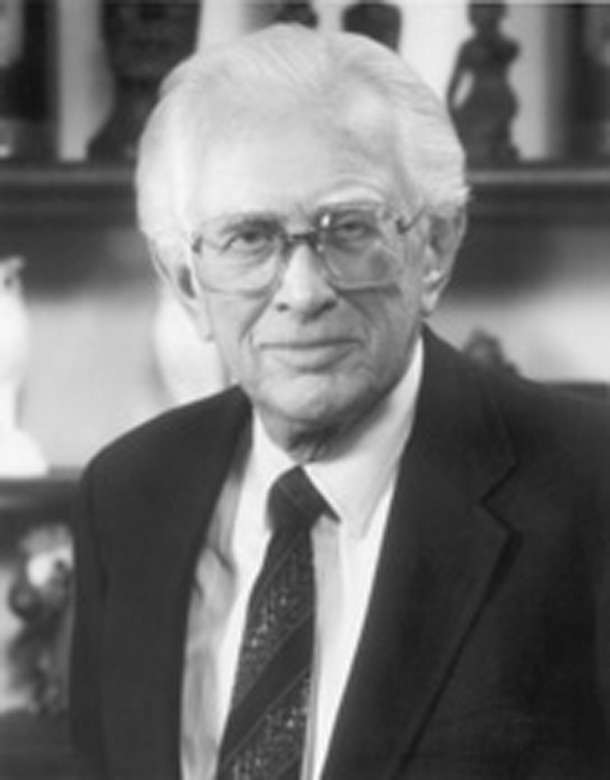
Howard Metzenbaum

- Gordon Allport – former psychologist
- H. Leslie Adams – former composer
- Leon Bibb – journalist
- Richard Bishop – former professional football player in the National Football League (NFL)
- Marvin Bower – former lawyer
- Bryant Browning – former professional football player in the National Football League (NFL)
- Christian Bryant – former professional football player in the National Football League (NFL)
- Coby Bryant – professional football player in the National Football League (NFL)
- Frank Clark – former professional football player in the National Football League (NFL)
- Davon Coleman – professional football player in the National Football League (NFL)
- Angelo Craig – former professional football player in the National Football League (NFL)
- Quincy Downing – sprinter
- Jayrone Elliott – former professional football player in the National Football League (NFL)
- Donnie Fletcher – former professional football player in the National Football League (NFL)
- Benny Friedman, former professional football player in the National Football League (NFL)
- Willie Gilbert – author and playwright
- Ted Ginn Jr. – former professional football player in the National Football League (NFL) and coach
- Maurice Goldman – composer, conductor.
- Donn Greenshields – former professional football player in the National Football League (NFL)
- Mark Gunn – former professional football player in the National Football League (NFL)
- Justin Hardee – former professional football player in the National Football League (NFL)
- Steve Harvey – actor, comedian
- Willie Henry – former professional football player in the National Football League (NFL)
- Jermale Hines – former professional football player in the National Football League (NFL)
- Wilson Hirschfeld – former journalist
- Ross Hunter – former film producer
- Cincere Johnson - college football player
- Cardale Jones – former professional football player in the National Football League (NFL)
- Marshon Lattimore – professional football player in the National Football League (NFL)
- Jerome Lawrence – former playwright
- Hal Lebovitz – former sportswriter, columnist
- Al Lerner – former pianist, composer
- Ruby Grant Martin – former lawyer, federal civil rights official
- Howard Metzenbaum – former U.S. senator
- Antwaun Molden – former professional football player in the National Football League (NFL)
- Jonathan Newsome – former professional football player in the National Football League (NFL)
- Ron O'Neal – former actor
- Max Ratner – former real estate developer
- Devine Redding – former professional football player in the National Football League (NFL)
- Arvell Reese – professional football player in the National Football League
- Mike Robinson – former professional football player in the National Football League (NFL)
- Michael Shane – former lawyer, actor
- Joe Shuster – co–creator of the comic book hero Superman
- Jerry Siegel – co–creator of the comic book hero Superman.
- Patricia Haynes Smith – member of the Louisiana House of Representatives
- Troy Smith – former professional football player in the National Football League (NFL)
- Ray Solomonoff – founder of Artificial Intelligence
- Ollie Welf – former professional baseball player in the Major League Baseball (MLB)
- Jack Weston – former actor
- Michael R. White – former mayor of Cleveland
- Donte Whitner – former professional football player in the National Football League (NFL)
- Lindsey Witten – former professional football player in the National Football League (NFL)
- Pierre Woods – former professional football player in the National Football League (NFL)
- Chris Worley – former professional football player in the National Football League (NFL)
- Shane Wynn – former professional football player in the National Football League (NFL)
- Curtis Young – former professional football player in the National Football League (NFL)
