= Camp Ramah in Wisconsin =

American Jewish summer camp

Coordinates: 46°00′24″N 89°20′54″W

Camp Ramah in Wisconsin is a Jewish summer camp based in Conover, Wisconsin, on Upper Lake Buckatabon. The Wisconsin camp was the first of the Ramah camps, established in 1947 by Rabbi Ralph Simon, under the direction of Conservative educator Henry Goldberg, with nearly 100 campers. It was sponsored by the Chicago Council of Conservative Synagogues and the Midwest Branch of the United Synagogue.

It draws campers from across the Midwest, primarily Chicago and the Twin Cities. Campers stay at the camp for either four or eight weeks, depending on their age division, or "eidah". Following Nivonim, the eidah for those entering 11th grade, campers are encouraged to participate in Ramah Israel Seminar. The summer following Seminar, they may apply to join the camp staff. The Camp Ramah Executive Director is Jacob Cytryn. The Director Emeritus of Ramah Wisconsin is Rabbi David Soloff.

== History ==
The first Ramah camp was built on a site purchased by the Jewish Theological Seminary on Larsen's Bay. The property was a fishing village on the shores of Upper Lake Buckatabon owned by the Larsen family, dotted with small cabins and wild flowers. Multi-purpose buildings were quickly erected, and the first campers arrived by train on the Flambau Express line. According to Shom Sefor Klaff's interview for the 50th reunion (Klaff was a camper in 1947), a seaplane brought the weekly movie to the camp. Klaff added that campers had a dress code to follow, especially for shabbat.

Irving Robbin, a former prisoner of war of the Nazis, was President of the camp for 19 years. In 1962, 260 boys and girls were campers during the summer.

In July 2008, busloads of campers from the camp took part in a rally in support of immigrant workers at the nation's largest kosher meat plant.

== Divisions (eidot) ==
- Ruach Ramah (Spirit of Ramah) (entering 3rd grade; 1-2 weeks long)
- Garinim (Seeds) (entering 4th & 5th grade; 4-8 weeks long)
- Halutzim (Pioneers) (entering 6th grade; 4-8 weeks long)
- Solelim (Trailblazers) (entering 7th grade; 8 weeks long)
- Shoafim (Aspirers) (entering 8th grade; 8 weeks long)
- Bogrim (Mature Ones) (entering 9th grade; 8 weeks long)
- Machon (Institution) (entering 10th grade; 8 weeks long)
- Nivonim (Wise Ones) (entering 11th grade; 8 weeks long)

== Amitzim program ==
=== Tikvah ===
The Tikvah program was established at Ramah Wisconsin in 1973, intended to offer the Ramah experience to teens with special needs. The Tikvah program was designed for campers with learning and social difficulties, including Asperger syndrome. It was discontinued after 2019, giving campers with disabilities inclusion in their respective eidot. The program at Ramah Wisconsin included a special "Mo'adon", or lounge building, with a kitchen and dedicated resources for the program.

=== Amitzim (Vocational program) ===
"Amitzim", meaning independent ones, is the name for the Tikvah vocational program. This is an eight-week program established shortly after 2002 focused on former Tikvah campers who are post-high school age. Participants work in the nearby town of Eagle River five mornings a week. Job locations include coffee shops, plant and garden supply stores, supermarkets and hotels. Participants return in the afternoon for a Judaica class and activities. Participants have their own lounge and kitchen, and live in dedicated staff housing. Participants have one day off a week, and do not work on Shabbat.

== Jewish values ==
=== Tefilot ===
Campers lead their own services three times a day, with each age division assigned its own Makom Tefilah (place of prayer). Camper responsibility for the services increases as campers age, with the oldest eidot not only leading, but reading Torah and haftara, and even providing divrei Torah (short speeches about the content and meaning of the parasha). Campers who do not have these liturgical skills sometimes spend their free time at camp learning how to lead services. Friday nights feature an all-camp service on the waterfront.

=== Shabbat ===
Ramah in Wisconsin is a Shabbat-observant camp. Many campers and staff members are not Sabbath observant at home, meaning Ramah in Wisconsin may be their first exposure to following the Jewish Sabbath. Campers and staff are not prohibited from using personal electronic devices in the cabin, but all are asked not to use such devices in public during Shabbat. Raw food is not cooked in the kitchen on Shabbat, but pre-cooked food is warmed in a manner that is permitted by Jewish law.

Shabbat is brought in all-camp Friday night services, which features campers dressing up for the evening, taking pictures in groups, and having time to sit and talk with friends and siblings. The service often features the melodies of Orthodox Rabbi Shlomo Carlebach. A special Shabbat dinner follows. Campers get to wake up later on Saturday mornings than they do on weekdays. After Shacharit and Musaf services which start the day, they have free time, which is often spent on the sports fields. After lunch, campers participate in Shabbat discussions, which are usually efforts to connect the weekly parsha with modern Jewish life. Shabbat concludes with Seudah Shlishit, evening activities and Havdalah.

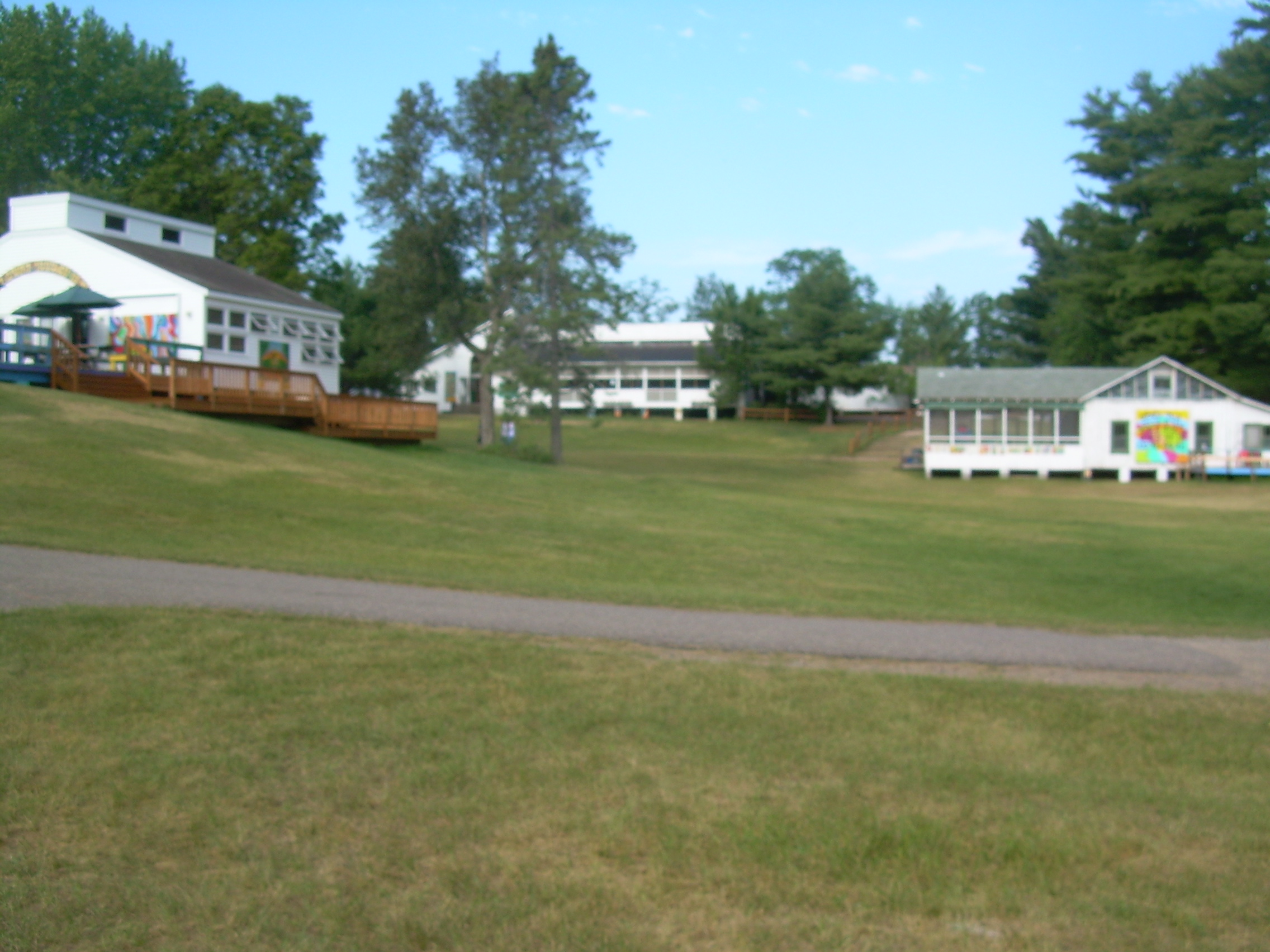
The kikar, or center of camp, in 2007. The old Chadar Ochel (dining room) is featured in back before the new one was built in 2009, and the old Omanut/Nagarut (art studio/woodshop) on the left before the new one was built in 2020.

=== Kashrut ===
Ramah in Wisconsin is a Kashrut-observant camp. Many campers and staff members are not Kashrut observant at home, so Ramah in Wisconsin may be their first exposure to keeping kosher. Camper orientation involves learning about the meat and dairy sides of the kitchen. Meals are served as either dairy or meat meals (even when the meal is parve, and full-time mashgichim (kashrut supervisors) are present in the kitchen throughout the day.

Only strictly kosher products are allowed in the camp, so food is not allowed in from outside. Campers are thus able to see that keeping kashrut can be part of a regular life.

== Education ==
The educational goals of the Ramah camps are to make Jewish learning a part of the everyday camp experience, using a combination of formal and informal educational tools. Campers are theoretically required to participate in six hours of Jewish studies a week during the school year. This requirement is often waived, as most Conservative synagogues do not offer the requisite number of hours. While not actually shown in the camp brochure, or talked about by campers in the promotional video, campers have a mandatory class every day (except Shabbat and Wednesdays), taught by a group of educators, rabbinical students, and camp staff . This formal education takes up one of the seven programming periods of the day.

=== Hebrew classes ===
Hebrew classes are mandatory for campers, excluding Machon and Nivonim, who have electives, and for those who participate in the Beit Midrash Program. They are arranged by level within each age division. Campers are tested at the start of the year. Classes are taught exclusively by members of the Mishlachat, Israelis who participate in an emissaries program run by the Jewish Agency. The teachers are usually young women who have recently completed their army/national service. They are not usually members of the Masorti movement, Israel’s Conservative Jewish community.

=== Jewish studies classes ===
Jewish study classes are mandatory for all campers excluding Machon and Nivonim, who have electives, and for those younger campers who do not participate in the Beit Midrash Program. These classes are not arranged by level, and often based on a theme or concept (Such as Shabbat or Tzedakah), rather than a text. They are often taught by rabbinical school students, or occasionally by Jewish day school teachers.

=== Beit Midrash ===
The Beit Midrash program offers campers in Bogrim and Machon a double period of study in place of Hebrew and Text, and offers Shoafim campers one period of study instead of their regular Jewish studies class. It is taught by Orthodox and some Conservative educators whose background is in Talmud and other Rabbinic texts. The Beit Midrash also includes a program called "the Northwoods Kollel", which unlike the traditional Orthodox model, is co-educational, and composed of between four and six college-age students who have usually not participated in the Ramah camping movement. Participants spend the day immersed in Talmud study. Classes focus on skill-building by reading a specific Rabbinic text, usually a perek of the Babylonian Talmud.

=== Hebrew outside the classroom ===
Ramah has been known as a Hebrew-speaking camp since its inception. Hebrew exams before camp were once required to gain enrollment. Near total immersion was once one of the effective techniques used by Ramah Wisconsin, with Hebrew usage being required to fulfill tasks such as getting food in the dining room or acquiring art supplies. After the 1970s, serious efforts in using Hebrew outside the classroom became limited. Hebrew is still publicly used in announcements in the dining room and camp-wide events, musicals, and the refereeing of softball games, though it is unclear if the campers understand the Hebrew they use. Some buildings are referred to by Hebrew names, but most camp activities and locations are referred to in a camp slang that is a mix of Hebrew and English, such as “Meltzing” for waiting tables (from the Hebrew מלצר for "waiter"). Eidot names are still in Hebrew.

=== Library ===
The Blanche Lippitz Library at the camp was established by the Sisterhoods of Illinois, Wisconsin, Indiana, and Michigan as a tribute to the services rendered by Lippitz.

== Activities ==
=== Tarbut (תרבות) ===
Camp Ramah In Wisconsin offers a number of activities for the campers. The main "Tarbut" (Hebrew for "culture") activities include:

- Omanut (אומנות) (includes pottery, copper enameling, batik, illustration, painting, and tie-dye)
- Nagarut (נגרות) (woodworking)
- Radio (רדיו) (FM radio)
- Music (מוסיקה)
- Rikud (ריקוד) (dance)
- Drama (דרמה)
- Cooking (מטבחון)

=== Sports (ספורט) ===
Every day, excluding Wednesdays and Saturdays, has sports periods for campers. They can choose from basketball, volleyball, aerobics, softball, tennis, kayaking, and sailing. In recent years, lacrosse, ultimate frisbee, soccer and field hockey have also been offered. Martial arts or self-defense, such as Judo and Krav Maga are occasional activities. In addition, the camp has a beach volleyball area, and while gaga is not offered as an activity choice, it is played regularly. In 2023, the camp introduced new sports courts including a junior basketball court and adjustable hoops for our younger campers, a championship court with bleachers, tennis courts with pickleball lines, and a playscape. The camp also built a Ninja Warriror Course where campers can increase their agility and build teamwork skills as they traverse our fun, engaging and challenging custom-built Ninja Warrior Course. Sports programs are recreational and competitive in nature, and do not focus on kinesthetic skill development. The most popular two sports are basketball and softball, because of the inter-eidah (age division) games in these two sports.

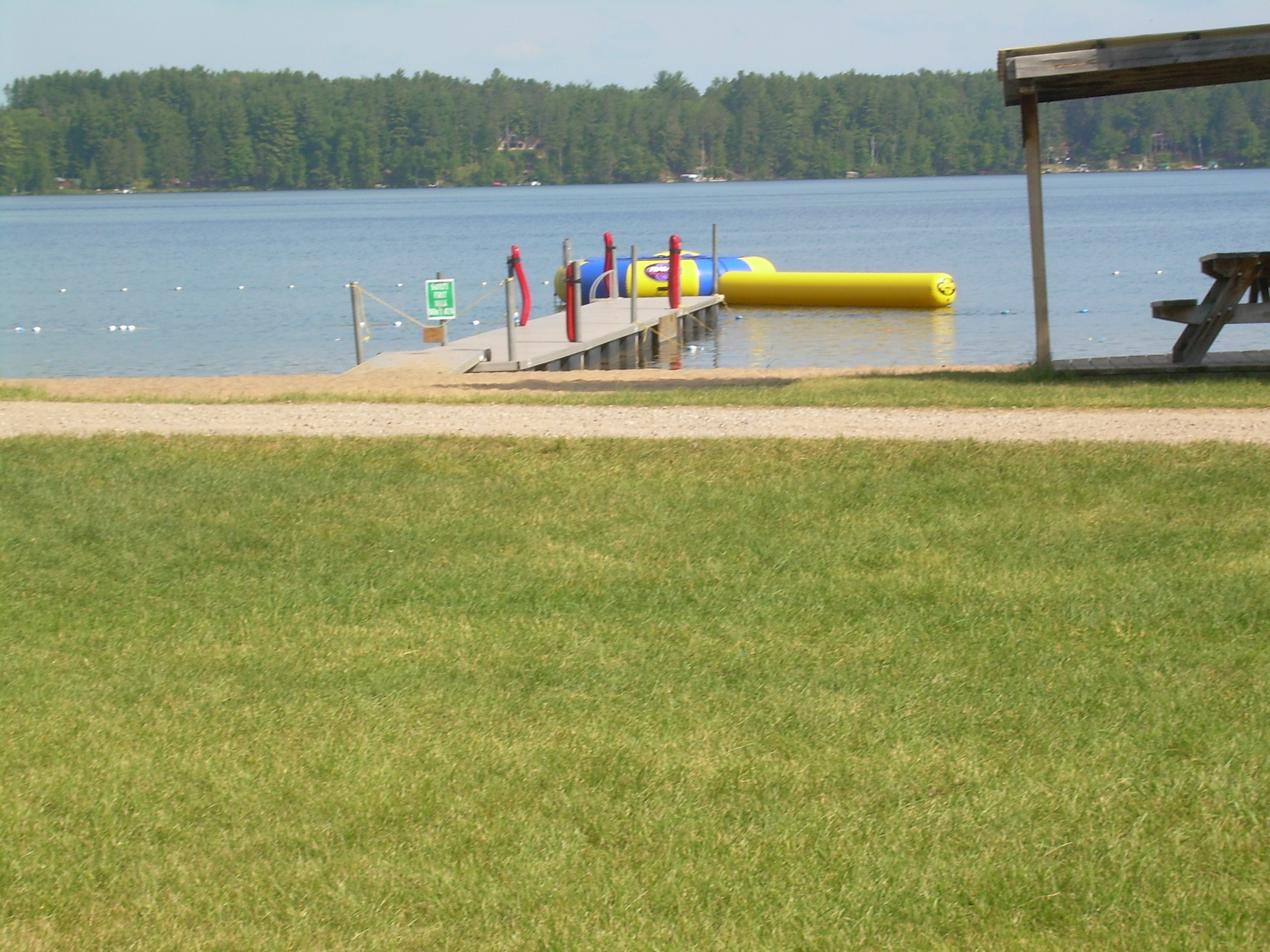
The Camp Ramah shores of Upper Lake Buckatabon. The waterfront has a sand beach and three docks with a "blob," or floating trampoline: and a "bloob", a water obstacle course.

==== Swimming ====
Every age division has a perek (time period) devoted swim class once a day. At the beginning of the summer, campers are tested and placed into an American Red Cross swimming class based on their skill level. Campers in the Machon age division are offered a chance to enroll in a lifeguarding course that offers American Red Cross certification for those who successfully complete the course. In 2022, the camp introduced tubing for campers. Campers ride on water tubes that trail behind motorboats.

== Facilities ==
=== Ohel Yitzchak ===
While all other prayer areas are part of multi-purpose rooms, each eidah spends time praying in Ohel Yitzchak, the only permanent synagogue on the campus. Named in memory of Rabbi Isaac Bonder, the synagogue has large windows that look out into the forest, and tent-like architecture. The parochet, or ark curtain, was created by Annabelle Argand, features a tree that has just begun to bloom, reflecting the life cut short of Rabbi Bonder. The path leading to the synagogue is also incomplete. The ner tamid is a crown that is actually a ring of people holding hands and created by Israeli artist Gedaliah ben Tzvi, and the Sheviti is a paper cut by Roger Coleson, a former camp teacher who also died at an early age.

=== Chadar Ochel ===
Ramah Wisconsin’s three dining rooms serve over 2,100 meals a day when camp is in full swing. The dining rooms are also used for various activities and events. A new facility with a renovated kitchen and three brand-new dining halls opened in June 2009.

== Annual events ==
=== Zimriah (Song Festival) ===
Early in the summer the Zimriah (song festival) takes place. Every eidah learns a song that follows a theme for the summer, with the majority of the songs coming from Israeli songwriters. Every eidah wears a color for that evening, giving the appearance of a color war. Garinim wears green, Halutzim wears yellow, Solelim wears purple, Shoafim wears red, Bogrim wears blue, Machon wears white. (While the oldest age division wears black, pre-2000 Zimriot saw Nivonim wearing tie-dye shirts, plaid, or even white.) After all eidot have sung their songs, each eidah stands up again and sings their own eidah song. Traditionally, the older eidot join in with the songs for the younger eidot. After all songs have been sung, the entire camp stands up and sings the Himnon Ramah, the camp song, which is traditionally sung after all camp-wide gatherings.

=== Rikudiah (Dance Festival) ===
Now held near the end of the summer, the Rikudiah was originally held on the tennis courts as a part of the visitors' weekend festivities. While the Rikudiah is open to all campers, only the youngest eidot dance as a whole eidah. Older }} are usually represented by those who take dance as a tarbut (cultural) activity. In addition, the Mishlachat (Israeli staff), the educational staff, the European staff and the administrative staff each perform a dance. When all the presentations are complete, the whole camp dances together, with each eidah called to bed until only Nivonim and staff remain.

The focus of the Rikudiah originally emphasized Israeli folk dance and dances to classic songs from Israel and Jewish traditional life. These aspects are no longer a part of the Wisconsin Rikudiah. The most predominant style of dance seen is a variation on urban/hip-hop dance, with the occasional modern or jazz dance piece.

=== Tisha B'Av ===
The fast day of Tisha B'Av is the only Jewish holiday that falls during the summer. Camp begins commemoration of the day with ma’ariv in the dining halls after a seudah mafseket (a meal to prepare for a fast). Nivonimers form paths of paper lanterns from dining hall to bet am, and the entire camp walks through the candle-lit paths to a communal reading of Aicah (the Book of Lamentations). Following the reading, campers fast and participate in discussions, role-playing simulations and other special activities until the breaking of the fast the following night (pre-bnai-mitzvah campers do not normally fast).

=== Yom Sport ===
Every year there is a Yom Sport, or "Sport Day". This day is similar to the traditional "color wars" found at other summer camps around the world. Campers are divided into four teams, traditionally having Red, Yellow, Blue, and Green. Campers from Nivonim are team captains, four for each team. Other Nivonim campers are part of the black team, or "Team Uber," or vice-administrators. Each team within each eidah compete with the other teams in the eidah throughout the event.

Throughout the day, campers are required to cheer in Hebrew, and often take up Israeli sports teams (Beitar, Hapoel, etc.) The day currently ends with a giant, camp-wide relay race called "The Apache," adaptation of the Jicarilla Apache religious ritual brought to Ramah Wisconsin from "Indian" camps (ostensibly teaching some form of Native American values). This adaptation of Native American practices, one of the few at Ramah lacking either a Hebrew name or a Jewish cultural reference, replaced the original end of day event, the camp wide tug-of-war. The events that make up the Apache change every year. Elements include both the whimsical, such as of a mummy wrap, tent building, and car washing, as well as physically more demanding events such as long distance swimming and running. The conclusion of the Apache is a fire building contest, where the victors are the first to snap a string suspended above their fire pit.

=== No smoking ===
No Smoking is the close-of-summer program that combines award ceremonies, encores of musical numbers from eidah musicals, and a multi-sectioned slide show on the last night of camp. No Smoking was originally a joke-filled roast of camp figures created in the late 1950s. Campers were responsible for their own program, and the musical interlude was a nonsensical jingle based on the doo-wop hit "Sha-boom," inspired by the songs in the dining room. As the camp grew and campers became more sensitive, the jokes and roasting elements were banned.

=== Musicals ===
Each eidah from Sollelim through Nivonim puts on a Broadway musical entirely in Hebrew. Certain plays are relegated to different eidot, such as "The Little Mermaid" and "Peter Pan" given to younger eidot such as Sollelim and Shoafim, because of their simplicity. More complex plays like "Mamma Mia", "Les Miserables" and "Hairspray" are usually reserved for Bogrim, Machon, and Nivonim because of complex and more mature subject matter.

Jonathan Adam Ross, Jewish theatre artist, who has performed his first solo show, “Walking in Memphis: The Life of a Southern Jew,” Off-Broadway is also a founding company member of the Northwoods Ramah Theatre and Storahtelling, and traces his acting roots to his longtime association with Camp Ramah in Wisconsin, where he serves as long-standing director of the performing arts. Dressed head to toe in bird fabrics and hopping on one leg, Mr. Ross debuted Bernard Melamud's, "The JewBird" first to audiences in Conover.

== See also ==
- Conservative Judaism
