= Richard Montanari =

American crime writer (born 1952)

- Born: December 6, 1952 (age 73); Cleveland, Ohio, U.S.
- Writing career
- Period: 1995–present
- Genres: Crime fiction, mystery, thriller
- Notable works: Deviant Way, Don't look Now, The Violet Hour, Kiss of Evil, The Rosary Girls, The Skin Gods, Merciless, Badlands, The Devil's Garden, The Echo Man
- Notable awards: Online Mystery Award – Best First Mystery; 1995 Deviant Way
- Website: richardmontanari.com

Richard Montanari (born December 6, 1952) is an American crime writer who debuted with his novel Deviant Way, published by Simon & Schuster, in 1995. It won the Online Mystery Award (OLMA) for Best First Mystery. He has since published seven more novels, which are now available in almost 30 languages.

In 2005 he began his Philadelphia crime series with The Rosary Girls, a police procedural thriller set inside the homicide unit of the Philadelphia Police Department, introducing detectives Kevin Byrne and Jessica Balzano.

Montanari was born in Northeast Ohio, where he still resides.

== Publishing history ==
=== Cleveland Series ===
- Deviant Ways (1995)
- Kiss of Evil (2001)

In 1995 Montanari wrote Deviant Way, introducing Cleveland Police Department homicide detective John Paris. The story, a suspense novel chronicling a pair of thrill killers, earned him a two-book deal from Michael Korda at Simon & Schuster. In 2001 Montanari published the sequel, Kiss of Evil. Both novels have been published worldwide, and were recently reissued by Random House UK.

=== Philadelphia Series ===
- The Rosary Girls (2005)
- The Skin Gods (2006)
- Merciless (2007) (UK title Broken Angels) (2007)
- Badlands (UK title Play Dead) (2008)
- The Echo Man (2011)
- The Killing Room (2012)
- The Stolen Ones (2013)
- The Doll Maker (2014)
- Shutter Man (2015)

Set inside the homicide unit of the Philadelphia Police Department, these novels include the alternating narratives of veteran police detective Kevin Francis Byrne, and his younger partner Jessica Balzano.

The stories, which "possess a psychological depth all too rare in such fiction" (Publishers Weekly), also include other recurring characters, most notably Detective Joshua Bontrager, who was, at one time, a member of the Amish church. This series is published in France by Le Cherche Midi, in Italy by Editrice Nord, in Germany by Verlagsgruppe Lübbe, and in Denmark by People's Press.

=== Other works ===
In addition to his crime series, Montanari has penned two stand-alone novels. In 1998 he published The Violet Hour, a thriller featuring freelance writer Nicky Stella. In 2009 he published The Devil’s Garden, a psychological thriller introducing New York District Attorney Michael Roman.

As a journalist Montanari has written essays, profiles, articles, and both film and literary criticism in more than 200 publications, including The Chicago Tribune, Detroit Free Press, The Seattle Times, The Plain Dealer, and many others.

According to a 1997 interview published in Volume XI, Issue 4 of Ohio Writer, Montanari's first screenplay "The Skin Gods" made it as far as the 1996 quarter-finals of the Nicholl Fellowship in Screenwriting Awards. The novel of the same name was published in 2003.
