= Matija Škerbec =

Slovene Catholic priest (1886–1963)

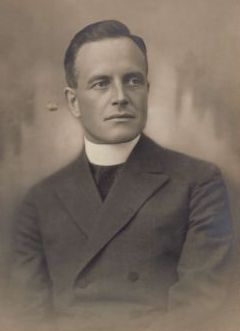
- Matija Škerbec

Orders
- Ordination: July 15, 1912

Personal details
- Born: Matija Škerbec; November 5, 1886 Podcerkev, Duchy of Carniola, Austria-Hungary
- Died: October 17, 1963 (aged 76) Cleveland, Ohio
- Buried: Calvary Cemetery (Cleveland)
- Denomination: Roman Catholic

Matija Škerbec (November 5, 1886 – October 17, 1963), was a Slovene Roman Catholic priest, political figure, and writer.

== Life ==
Matija Škerbec was born in the village of Podcerkev on November 5, 1886 to the tenant farmers Frančiška (née Palčič) and Matija Škerbec.

He attended high school in Ljubljana from 1900 to 1908, and then studied theology in Ljubljana, graduating in 1912. He served in the military for one year, achieving the rank of cadet.

Škerbec was ordained on July 15, 1912. He first served at the seminary, and then as a curate in Škocjan from 1913 to 1916. He was a vicar at the Ljubljana Cathedral from 1916 to 1922. He served as the parish priest in Tržič from 1922 to 1928. In 1928 he was appointed diocesan spiritual advisor by Bishop Anton Bonaventura Jeglič. He then served as the parish priest in Kranj from 1928 to 1936, where he had the parish church renovated and a new altar installed in 1934. From 1936 to 1941 he served as dean in Kranj, which was the largest deanery in Slovenia at that time. In 1937 he expanded the Kranj orphanage.

== Work ==
Škerbec founded the Tržič Parish Bulletin (Slovene: Cerkveni glasnik za tržiško župnijo) in 1924 and edited it until 1928. In 1925 he founded the Runa Leatherworkers' Association in Tržič. From 1929 to 1941 he edited the Kranj Bell (Slovene: Kranjski zvon), the parish bulletin for Kranj.

He was a member of the Slovene People's Party, in which he was engaged with labor and social issues, closely associating with Marko Natlačen and Anton Korošec. In 1932 he was arrested and then imprisoned in 1933 for a year for participating in the anti-regime incident known as the Šenčur Events (Slovene: Šenčurski dogodki) on May 22, 1932.

He started working for the Caritas charity in Ljubljana in 1942, which not only aided refugees, but also helped finance the anti-communist MVAC. In 1943 he participated in the Anticommunist Committee (Slovene: Protikomunistični odbor) and helped organized the Home Guard in Upper Carniola. In May 1945 he emigrated first to Austrian Carinthia, where he participated in establishing the Social Committee for the Assistance of Slovenian Refugees, and then to the United States.

After the war, Škerbec lived in Cleveland, Ohio, from 1949 onward as one of 28 refugee priests from Bishop Gregorij Rožman's diocese. There his writings focused on wartime and postwar atrocities. These publications detailed not only large-scale events, such as the Kucja Valley massacre, Kočevski Rog massacre, and Bleiburg death marches, but also more local events such as the extrajudicial killings at Babna Gora, Brezje pri Dobrovi, and Žažar. He was tried in absentia by the communist regime and sentenced to death.

Following the death of exiled Bishop Gregorij Rožman in 1959, Škerbec was a central figure in Slovenian emigration, in both religious and secular matters. Škerbec died on October 17, 1963, at St. Vincent Charity Hospital in Cleveland and he was buried at Calvary Cemetery in Cleveland.

== Bibliography ==
- Šenčurski dogodki (The Šenčur Events; Kranj, 1937)
- Naša Gospa presvetega Srca: šmarnice za l. 1942 (Our Lady of the Most Sacred Heart: May Devotions for 1942; Ljubljana, 1942)
- Poročilo o delovanju škofijske dobrodelne pisarne v Ljubljani za leto 1943 (Report on the Operation of the Episcopal Charity Office in Ljubljana for 1943; Ljubljana, 1944)
- Spomini in reminiscence na katoliško gibanje med Slovenci zadnjih 35 let (Memories and Reminiscences of the Catholic Movement among the Slovenes in the Past Thirty-Five Years; c. 1948)
- Rdeča zver, pijana krvi (The Red Beast, Drunk on Blood; Cleveland, 1950, 1951, 1951, 1952; 4 vol.)
- Krivda rdeče fronte (The Guilt of the Red Front; Cleveland, 1954, 1957, 1961; 3 vol.)
- Pregled novodobnega slovenskega katoliškega gibanja (Overview of the Modern Slovenian Catholic Movement; Cleveland, 1956, 1957; 2 vol.)
