= Robert D. Storey =

American lawyer (1936–2025)

Robert D. Storey (28 March 1936 – 11 June 2025) was an American lawyer, philanthropist, university trustee, and corporate director.

== Early life and education ==
Robert "Bob" Storey was born to DeWitt Storey and Katie Storey (née Johnson) on 28 March 1936 in Tuskegee, Alabama. He was the youngest of their two sons. He graduated from Harvard University with an A.B. in 1958. He later graduated from Case Western Reserve University with a J.D. in 1964. Storey was admitted to the Ohio state bar that same year.

== Career ==
Storey began his career as an attorney with East Ohio Gas in 1964. In 1966, he served became the assistant director of the Legal Aid Society of Cleveland. Storey was a partner at the Cleveland-based legal firm of McDonald, Hopkins, Burke & Haber, LPA. He had joined its predecessor in 1967 and became a partner in 1971. Storey became a partner at the law firm of Thompson Hine, LLP.

Storey was a director of The May Department Stores Company.

He served on the board of directors of Procter & Gamble from 1988 until 2006, and he was Chairman of the Public Policy Committee and member of the Board Organization and Nominating Committee.

Storey was a director of Verizon Communications from 2000 to 2008. He served on the board of directors of Verizon's predecessor GTE beginning in 1985.

Storey served as a trustee at Spelman College, The Kresge Foundation, The George Gund Foundation, Phillips Exeter Academy, Case Western Reserve University, and Cleveland State University. He also served on Harvard University's Board of Overseers.

He served as a director of the Federal Reserve Bank of Cleveland from 1987 to 1990.

== Personal life and death ==
Storey married Juanita "Nita" (née Cohen) in 1959 whom he met while both were students at Harvard University. Nita died in St. Augustine, Florida on January 11, 2024. They had three children, Charles, Rebecca, and Christopher. All three of their children are graduates of Harvard University as well.

Storey died on June 11, 2025 in St. Augustine, Florida, at the age of 89.
