= Bammental =

- Municipality
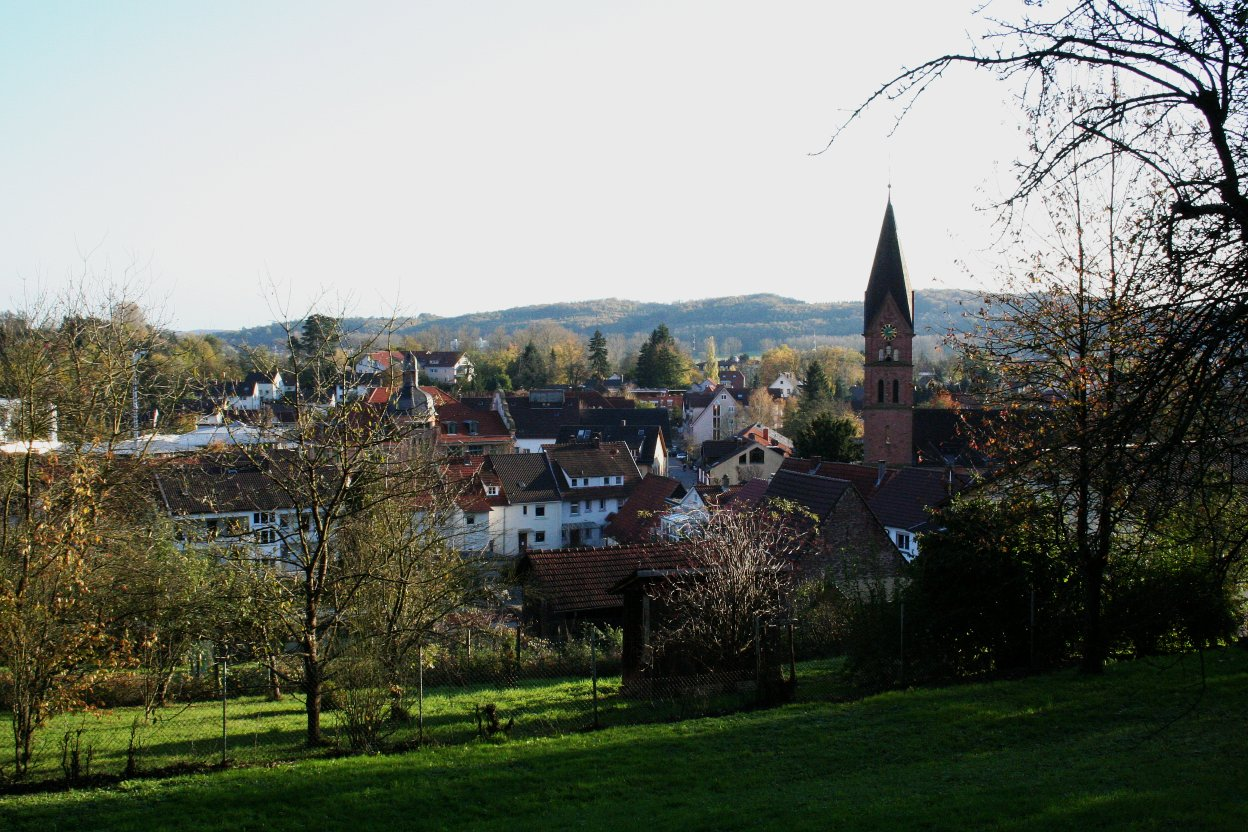
- The center of Bammental with the town hall and the Lutheran church

- Coat of arms

- Location of Bammental within Rhein-Neckar-Kreis district
- Interactive map of Bammental
- Location within Germany Location within Baden-Württemberg
- Coordinates: 49°21′03″N 08°46′33″E
- Country: Germany
- State: Baden-Württemberg
- Admin. region: Karlsruhe
- District: Rhein-Neckar-Kreis

Government
  - Mayor (2018–26): Holger Karl

Area
  - Total: 12.16 km^{2} (4.70 sq mi)
- Elevation: 125 m (410 ft)

Population (2025-12-31)
  - Total: 6,266
  - Density: 515.3/km^{2} (1,335/sq mi)
- Time zone: UTC+01:00 (CET)
  - Summer (DST): UTC+02:00 (CEST)
- Postal codes: 69243–69245
- Dialling codes: 06223
- Vehicle registration: HD
- Website: www.bammental.de

Bammental is a municipality in Rhein-Neckar-Kreis of Baden-Württemberg, Germany.

== Geography ==
Bammental is about 9 km southeast of Heidelberg and 13 km northwest of Sinsheim in the Elsenz valley, between Mauer and Neckargemünd. The borough of Reilsheim belongs to Bammental.

=== Neighboring communities ===
- Neckargemünd
- Gauangelloch
- Wiesenbach (Baden)
- Mauer (Baden)
- Gaiberg

== History ==
Bammental has been settled since pre-history. Homo heidelbergensis found in neighboring Mauer, lived in the area around Bammental 500,000 to 600,000 years ago. The remains of a Roman road and Roman buildings bear witness to settlement by the Romans.

At the end of the 8th century, there were multiple mentions of the Frankish settlement, Risolfesheim, in the Lorsch Codex. This settlement is the borough Reilsheim. Bammental started as an extension of Reilsheim at the turn of the millennium. From 1330 to 1803, Bammental belonged to the Electorate of the Palatinate of the Rhein. Bammental belonged to the Meckesheim tithe. After 1803, the settlement went to Baden.

== Government ==
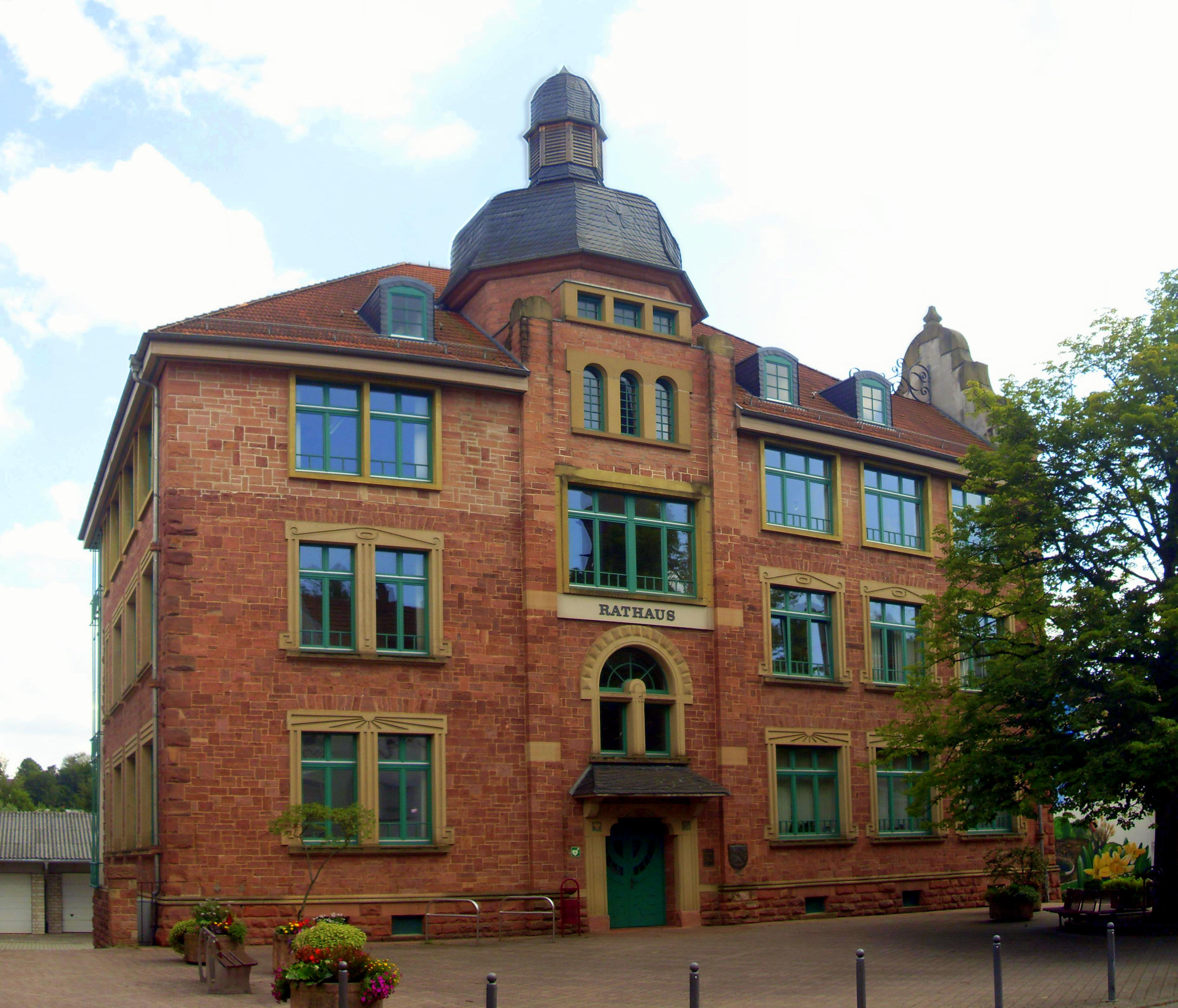
Town hall Bammental

=== Municipal council ===
Municipal Council 2019
| Party | Percentage | Seats |
| CDU/resident association | 27,4 % (–4,6) | 5 (-2) |
| Green Party | 23,3 % (+3,2) | 4 (+1) |
| Pro Bammental | ?? | 3 (±0) |
| SPD | 17,9 % (+0,2) | 3 (±0) |
| Independent Voters Bammental | ?? | 3 (±0) |
Voter participation: 68,4 %

=== Coat of arms ===
The coat of arms is based on an earlier court seal. The seal has been documented to have been in use since 1747. It was officially recognized in 1894 by the General State Archive. The lion and the field of lozenges represent the Electorate of the Palatinate of the Rhine. The tree represents the etymological origin of the name Bammental, Baum im Tal (tree in the valley).

The flag is green and white and was awarded by the Ministry of the Interior in 1965.

=== Sister cities ===
Vertus, France since 18 June 1966

== Culture and sights ==
There is a museum of local history (Heimatmuseum) in the old train station.

== Economy and infrastructure ==
=== Transportation ===
Bammental is on federal highway (Bundesstraße) B 45 between Neckargemünd and Sinsheim.

The train line, which comes from Heidelberg over Neckargemünd and afterwards goes on to Sinsheim, has two stops in Bammental. The connection is part of the S-train system of the Rhine-Neckar region.

- At the old train station (Bammental)
- In Reilsheim

=== Sons and daughters of the community ===
- Wilhelm Kling (1902-1973), politician (KPD, SED)

=== Other persons associated with Bammental ===
- Hansi Flick (* 1965), football coach, former assistant of Jogi Löw, lives in Bammental
