= Wilson Hirschfeld =

American journalist

Wilson Hirschfeld (September 4, 1916 — March 2, 1974) was a journalist and former managing editor of The Plain Dealer.

In his teenage years Wilson attended Glenville High School along with Superman creators Jerry Siegel and Joe Shuster, graduating in 1934. He served on Glenville High School's student newspaper, "The Torch", alongside Siegel and Shuster. It is believed that Wilson was the model for Superman's alter-ego, Clark Kent.

In 1936 he started his career at The Plain Dealer (Cleveland, Ohio), delivering newspapers inside the building. Wilson attended Cleveland College of Western Reserve University as a night student, working at the Plain Dealer during the day.

During World War II Wilson served with the United States Army Air Forces from 1942 to 1945 in England, France, and Italy. He was inducted into military service as a private and left active duty as a captain.

After the war Wilson returned to the Plain Dealer as a reporter, covering a variety of assignments and winning numerous awards for his work. Among the variety of posts Wilson held were those of police beat reporter, general assignment reporter, City Editor, State Editor, Transportation Editor, Business Editor and finally the above-mentioned Managing Editor. He left the Plain Dealer in 1973.

In 1971 The Plain Dealer was one of five entries recommended by the jury for a Pulitzer Prize in public service. Wilson, along with fellow Plain Dealer staff members David Hopcraft, Richard Zimmerman, Robert Burdock, Richard Widman and Donald Barlett, contributed to the stories.

Wilson's sister, Mary Hirschfeld, was also a career journalist employed by The Plain Dealer from approximately 1929 to 1990, working for the paper to the age of 81. Mary died in 1991. While she covered many reporting and feature writing assignments Mary will probably be best remembered for her "Mary Hears" society column and specialty in covering Latin American affairs.

- As cited in an essay by Dennis Dooley entitled "The Man of Tomorrow and the Boys of Yesterday" within the book (on page 30) "Superman at Fifty - The Persistence of a Legend!" edited by Dennis Dooley and Gary Engle, copyright 1987 by Octavia Press of Cleveland, Ohio. ISBN 0-940601-00-1
