= Hal Lebovitz =

American sportswriter and columnist

Lebovitz

Hal Lebovitz (September 11, 1916 – October 18, 2005) was a sportswriter and columnist. He was a fixture on Cleveland, Ohio's sports scene for more than six decades. In 2000, he was inducted into the writer's wing of the National Baseball Hall of Fame and Museum.

Born in Cleveland, he graduated from Glenville High School in 1934 and went on to Western Reserve University where he received a degree in chemistry. He had always wanted to be a journalist, and he became the sports editor of the school newspaper.

He got his first job covering high school sports for the Cleveland News in 1942 and soon became a beat writer covering the Cleveland Browns and the Cleveland Indians. He was hired by The Plain Dealer in 1960 and was the paper's sports editor from 1964 to 1982. His writing continued to appear regularly in The News-Herald and The Morning Journal (Lorain, Ohio) until his death in 2005 at the age of 89. (One of his columns, asserting that "any boy who turns out to play football should have his chance to play, somewhere, somehow", was quoted by the comic strip Gil Thorp on August 29, 1970.)

He also coached baseball, basketball, and football and officiated all three sports, including a stint as a referee traveling with the Harlem Globetrotters. He was famous for his great knowledge of sports rules and wrote a popular newspaper column, "Ask Hal the Referee" which ran in both The Plain Dealer and The Sporting News, in which he answered intricate questions about sports rules.

His writing was featured 17 times in the annual Best Sports Stories and selected for numerous other anthologies. He won many writing awards and was inducted into 12 halls of fame.

== Bibliography ==
- Ask Hal, (2007) ISBN 978-1-59851-034-8
- The Best of Hal Lebovitz, (2006) ISBN 978-1-59851-023-2
