= List of people from Shaker Heights, Ohio =

The following is a list of natives, residents and former residents of Shaker Heights, Ohio.

== A ==
- Adam B. Abelson, lawyer and United States federal judge
- Danesha Adams, soccer player
- Rasheen Ali, football running back
- Griff Allen, auto racing promoter, broadcaster, engineer
- Erick Anderson, football linebacker
- Albert Ayler, jazz saxophonist

== B ==
- Jamie Babbit, director, producer, and screenwriter
- Newton D. Baker, politician
- Bill Balas, screenwriter, director, producer
- Majel Barrett, actress and producer
- William Bayer, crime fiction writer
- Carter Bays, television writer, creator of How I Met Your Mother
- David Mark Berger, weightlifter, one of 11 Israeli athletes murdered by Arab commandos at the 1972 Munich Olympic Games
- Peter Bergman, member of the Firesign Theatre
- The Beverly Brothers (Mike Enos and Wayne Bloom), wrestlers billed as hailing from Shaker Heights
- Leon Bibb, television anchor
- Keith Black, neurosurgeon
- John Blackburn, songwriter
- Sara J. Bloomfield, executive director of the United States Holocaust Memorial Museum
- Roberts Blossom, actor and poet
- Andy Borowitz, comedian and satirist
- Eric Brakey, politician and Maine state senator
- Jim Brickman, musician
- Aris Brimanis, ice hockey defenseman
- Paul Brown, football coach and owner
- Dick Brubaker, football player for the Chicago Cardinals and Buffalo Bills
- Judith Butler, gender theorist and philosopher

== C ==
- Jane L. Campbell, politician; 56th mayor of Cleveland
- James Card, film preservationist
- Martha Chase, geneticist
- Adrien Clarke, Virginia Destroyers offensive lineman
- Ward Cleaver, fictional character in Leave It to Beaver
- Nate Clements, Cincinnati Bengals cornerback
- Wat T. Cluverius, diplomat
- Anne Cochran, singer
- Gary Cohn, president and COO of Goldman Sachs, economic advisor to the Trump Administration
- Jim Cohn, poet
- Bruce Cole, former chairman of the National Endowment for the Humanities
- Constance Cook, Republican Party politician
- Tom Corcoran, writer

== D ==
- Rebecca Dallet, Wisconsin Supreme Court justice
- Marc Dann, former Ohio attorney general
- William Daroff, chief executive officer of the Conference of Presidents of Major American Jewish Organizations
- Arthur Carter Denison, federal judge
- Cheri Dennis, singer-songwriter
- Derf Backderf, John Backderf, cartoonist
- Samuel Deutsch, jeweler and sports franchise owner
- Maximilian Dimoff, principal bassist of the Cleveland Orchestra

== E ==
- Eric Ehrmann, author and columnist
- Harry Eisenstat, baseball pitcher
- James Emery, jazz guitarist

== F ==
- Michelle Federer, theatre and film actress
- Danny Ferry, former NBA player; former general manager of the Cleveland Cavaliers
- Bobby Few, jazz pianist
- Eric Fingerhut, politician and academic administrator
- Craig Finn, singer and guitarist
- Nate Fish, American-Israeli writer, baseball player/coach
- Lee Fisher, former lieutenant governor of Ohio
- James Frey, author
- Devin Friedman, journalist
- Marcia Fudge, congresswoman

== G ==
- Zelma Watson George, actress, philanthropist
- Jeff Gerth, journalist
- Nicole Gibbs, tennis player
- Anand Giridharadas, writer and newspaper columnist
- Rick Glassman, actor and comedian
- Samuel Glazer, co-developer of Mr. Coffee
- Maurice Goldman, composer
- Stuart Goldman, journalist, screenwriter, musician
- Derrick Green, musician, singer of the band Sepultura and Maximum Hedrum
- Richard J. Green, chemist
- Tom Griswold, co-host of The Bob & Tom Show
- Robert Lee Grossman, computer scientist and bioinformatician
- Matt Guerrier, baseball player

== H ==
- Jamey Haddad, percussionist
- Dorothy Hart, actress
- Jerry Heller, rap manager
- Caroline Hoxby, economist

== I ==
- David Icove, former FBI Academy instructor

== J ==
- Paul Jones, judge
- Peter Lawson Jones, Cuyahoga County commissioner

== K ==
- Paul Kantor, violin teacher
- Kid Cudi, born Scott Mescudi, rapper
- Donald James Kirk, accountant
- Freddie Kitchens, NFL head coach
- Archibald Klumph, founder of the Rotary Foundation
- Andrew Kober, stage actor
- Ralph Kohl, football player, coach and scout
- Ralph and Terry Kovel, antiques writers and television hosts

== L ==
- Jaime Laredo, violinist
- Courtney Ledyard, football linebacker
- Al Lerner, late owner of the Cleveland Browns and former chairman of MBNA
- Michael Lesy, writer and professor
- Eddie Levert, lead singer of The O'Jays
- Gerald Levert, musician
- Sean Levert, musician
- Mark F. Lindsay, assistant to the president of the United States for Management and Administration under Bill Clinton
- Tommy LiPuma, music producer
- Wesley Lowery, The Washington Post journalist
- Orlando Lowry, football linebacker
- Matthew Luckiesh, physicist

== M ==
- Lorin Maazel, conductor
- Machine Gun Kelly, born Colson Richard Baker, rapper
- Kevin Mackey, college basketball coach
- Gordon Macklin, businessman
- Dave Malkoff, Network News Correspondent
- Wade Manning, NFL wide receiver
- Bill Mason, jewel thief
- Lance Mason, politician
- Michael McElroy, actor
- Marc Mencher, video game industry executive
- Howard Metzenbaum, U.S. senator
- Aaron David Miller, Middle East analyst, author, and negotiator
- Creighton Miller, attorney who helped organize the National Football League Players Association
- Max Miller, Republican politician and U.S. House of Representatives congressman
- Thomas Modly, former United States Secretary of the Navy
- Justin Morrow, MLS soccer player
- Ted Mosby, fictional character in How I Met Your Mother
- Otis Moss III, pastor of Chicago's Trinity United Church of Christ
- Felice Mueller, rower

== N ==
- Paul Newman, actor and auto racer
- Billy Newton-Davis, R&B, jazz and gospel singer-songwriter
- Celeste Ng, writer

== O ==
- Susan Orlean, journalist
- Peter Ostrum, actor

== P ==
- Paula Jai Parker, actress
- Harvey Pekar, comic book writer
- Roger Penske, race car driver, team owner, and business entrepreneur
- David Pogue, technology writer, journalist and commentator
- James Alan Polster, novelist, movie producer and journalist
- Dan A. Polster, judge
- Greg Pruitt, football running back

== R ==
- Joshua Radin, singer-songwriter
- Bruce Ratner, philanthropist and real estate developer; on the board of directors for Forest City Enterprises
- Ellen Ratner, news analyst
- Mark Ratner, chemist
- Michael Ratner, attorney and human rights activist
- Betty Anne Rees, actor
- Matthew Rhodes, film producer
- Beth Richie, professor of African American Studies, Sociology, Gender and Women's Studies, and Criminology, Law, and Justice at the University of Illinois at Chicago
- Laurel J. Richie, current president of the Women's National Basketball Association
- Geraldo Rivera, attorney and talk show host
- Sharon Robinson, cellist
- Michael Roizen, physician
- Chris Rose, NFL Network sportscaster
- Terry Rozier, basketball player
- Keith Rucker, football defensive tackle
- Michael Ruhlman, writer
- Campy Russell, basketball player
- John Morris Russell, conductor

== S ==
- Marlene Sanders, journalist
- Scott Savol, American Idol finalist
- Leonard Sax, MD/PhD, physician and author
- Michael Scharf, law professor and director of Frederick K. Cox International Law Center
- Alan Schechter, film producer
- Kathryn Schulz, journalist and writer
- Molly Shannon, comedian
- Maria Siemionow, surgeon at the Cleveland Clinic
- Charlie Sifford, African American former professional golfer who helped to desegregate the PGA of America
- Rabbi Abba Hillel Silver, rabbi, Zionist spokesman and leader
- Marisa Silver, author, screenplay writer, and director
- Ben Simon, NHL ice hockey center
- Jamil Smith, print and television journalist
- Charles E. Spahr, Sohio president and CEO
- David Spero, DJ, music manager
- Stephen Stucker, actor
- Bob Switzer, inventor
- Michael Symon, Iron Chef, restaurateur, and television host
- George Szell, former conductor of the Cleveland Orchestra

== T ==
- Bill Taft, rock musician
- Kingsley A. Taft, politician
- Milan Tiff, Olympic triple jumper

== U ==
- Loung Ung, Cambodian American human rights activist and author

== V ==
- William R. Van Aken, politician
- Van Sweringen brothers, real estate developers of Shaker Heights and railroad tycoons
- Ralph Vince, football player and coach
- Christoph von Dohnányi, conductor
- Daniel Vovak, political comedian and author
- Vronsky & Babin, duo-piano team

== W ==
- David Wain, actor, filmmaker and comedian
- Clay Weiner, director
- Dr. Robert J. White, neurosurgeon
- Shereé Whitfield, from The Real Housewives of Atlanta
- Kym Whitley, comedian and actress
- Fred Willard, comedian
- Milton A. Wolf, real estate developer and U.S. ambassador
- Sidney M. Wolfe, drug safety activist

== Z ==
- Jack Zwerner, professional poker player and entrepreneur

== See also ==
- List of people from Cleveland
- List of people from Ohio
