= Polster =

Polster is a surname.

Notable people with this surname include:

- Bernd Polster (born 1952), German author
- Burkard Polster (born 1965), German mathematician and math popularizer
- Dan Polster (born 1951), American judge
- Hermann Christian Polster (born 1937), German opera singer
- James Alan Polster (1947–2012), American novelist
- James Polster (born 1979), American volleyball player
- Keith Polster, designer of The Fright at Tristor, a Dungeons & Dragons adventure module
- Manuel Polster (born 2002), Austrian footballer
- Matt Polster (born 1993), American footballer
- Miriam Polster (1924–2001), US clinical psychologist
- Nikolas Polster (born 2002), Austrian footballer
- Rita Polster (born 1948), Finnish film actress
- Toni Polster (born 1964), Austrian footballer and former player
- Victor Polster (born 2002), Belgian actor and dancer

== See also ==
- Sheri Polster Chappell (born 1962), American judge
