= Ohio Western Reserve National Cemetery =

Veterans cemetery in Medina County, Ohio

- Interactive map of Ohio Western Reserve National Cemetery

Details
- Established: 2000
- Location: Medina County, Ohio
- Country: United States
- Coordinates: 40°59′59″N 81°48′40″W
- Type: National
- Owned by: Department of Veterans Affairs
- Size: 273 acres (110 ha)
- No. of graves: >60,000
- Website: www.cem.va.gov/cems/nchp/ohiowesternreserve.asp
- Find a Grave: Ohio Western Reserve National Cemetery

Ohio Western Reserve National Cemetery is a United States National Cemetery located in the city of Seville, OH, in Medina County, Ohio. Administered by the United States Department of Veterans Affairs, it encompasses 273 acres (1.10 km^{2}), and as of 2026, has had over 60,000 interments.

== History ==
Dedicated in 2000, Ohio Western Reserve National Cemetery is the second national cemetery built in Ohio and the 119th National Cemetery created. Only a portion of it has been developed for use, but the rest is intended to service the interment needs of veterans and their families well into the future. The name Ohio Western Reserve refers part of the Northwest Territory, formerly known as the Connecticut Western Reserve, a tract of land in northeastern Ohio reserved by the state of Connecticut when it ceded its claims to western lands to the federal government in 1786.

In October 2022, the cemetery purchased Rawiga Country Club just to the south adding roughly 150 acres to the cemetery for a total of approximately 423 acres. Official annexation will not begin for another 10–15 years or when the land becomes needed.

== Notable burials ==
- Edmund Abel (1921–2014) – Inventor who designed Mr. Coffee
- Paul Drayton (1939–2000) – United States team Olympic sprinter
- Noah Purifoy (1917–2004) – Artist and World War II Navy veteran
- Ray Semproch (1931-2024) - Baseball player
- Dick Tomanek (1931–2023) - Baseball player
