= Little Fires Everywhere =

Little Fires Everywhere may refer to:

- Little Fires Everywhere (novel), 2017 book by Celeste Ng
- Little Fires Everywhere (miniseries), 2020 Hulu series
