= Gavin Lewis =

American actor (born 2003)

- Born: October 27, 2003 (age 23); Salt Lake City, Utah, U.S.
- Occupation: Actor
- Years active: 2015–present

Gavin Lewis (born October 27, 2003) is an American actor. He is best known for the role of Moody Richardson in the American drama streaming television miniseries Little Fires Everywhere and Prince Maxemil “Emil” Vanderklaut III in the Netflix sitcom Prince of Peoria.

== Early life ==
Lewis was born in Salt Lake City, Utah to theatre professionals Kyle and Colleen Lewis. He was diagnosed with Type 1 diabetes at age 6. Shortly after his diagnosis, he met singer and actor Nick Jonas who also has Type 1 diabetes. This meeting inspired Lewis to pursue acting and music. At the age of 9, he booked his first role in a feature film which was filming in Park City, Utah. This production led to a meeting with an acting manager in Los Angeles and his full-time career in film and television.

== Career ==
Lewis began his career working on Utah stages. He was classically trained at a very young age, earning top honors at the Utah Shakespeare Festival's Shakespeare Competition. Lewis has played various roles in several films and television series, such as Maximum Ride, NCIS: Los Angeles, The Kicks, No Good Nick, and Roswell, New Mexico.

In 2018, Lewis was cast as Prince Emil in the Netflix live-action multi-cam comedy Prince of Peoria. In 2019, he was cast as Elena Richardson's (played by Reese Witherspoon) son Moody Richardson on Hulu’s adaptation of the Celeste Ng best seller Little Fires Everywhere. He also joined the main cast of HBO Max's reboot of Head of the Class, which premiered in October 2021. Lewis has a recurring role in Shrinking on Apple TV+ which premiered in 2023.

== Filmography ==
=== Film ===
Year	Title	Role	Notes
2015	Real Boy	Thomas	Short film
2016	Maximum Ride	Gazzy	
2017	When Pigs Fly	Young Al	Short film
2017	Odious	Jeremy	
2018	In Searching	Young Jon	
2021	Old Henry	Wyatt	
2026	Quarter	Nick	Post-production

=== Television ===
Year	Title	Role	Notes
2015	Comedy Bang! Bang!	Lone Boy	Episode: "Randall Park Wears Brown Dress Shoes With Blue Socks"
2015	Just Jacques	Brent	3 episodes
2015	Ominous	Jacob Young	TV film
2015	OMG!	Brent	3 episodes
2016	NCIS: Los Angeles	Nadir, Karim and Tomar Zahavi	Episode: "The Seventh Child"
2016	The Kicks	Max	Episode: "The Best Defense Is a Good Offense"
2017	Hey Arnold!: The Jungle Movie	Eugene (voice)	TV film
2017	The Bugaloos	I.Q.	TV film
2018–19	Prince of Peoria	Prince Emil	Main role; 18 episodes
2019	Roswell, New Mexico	Young Michael Guerin	Episode: "Smells Like Teen Spirit"
2019	No Good Nick	Omar	Episode: "The Charity Mugger"
2020	Little Fires Everywhere	Moody Richardson	Main role; 8 episodes
2021	Head of the Class	Luke Burrows	Main role
2023–24	Shrinking	Connor	Recurring; 9 episodes
2025	Devil in Disguise: John Wayne Gacy	Timothy McCoy	Episode: "Tim, John and Rob"
