= Shaker Heights High School =

Public high school in Shaker Heights, Ohio

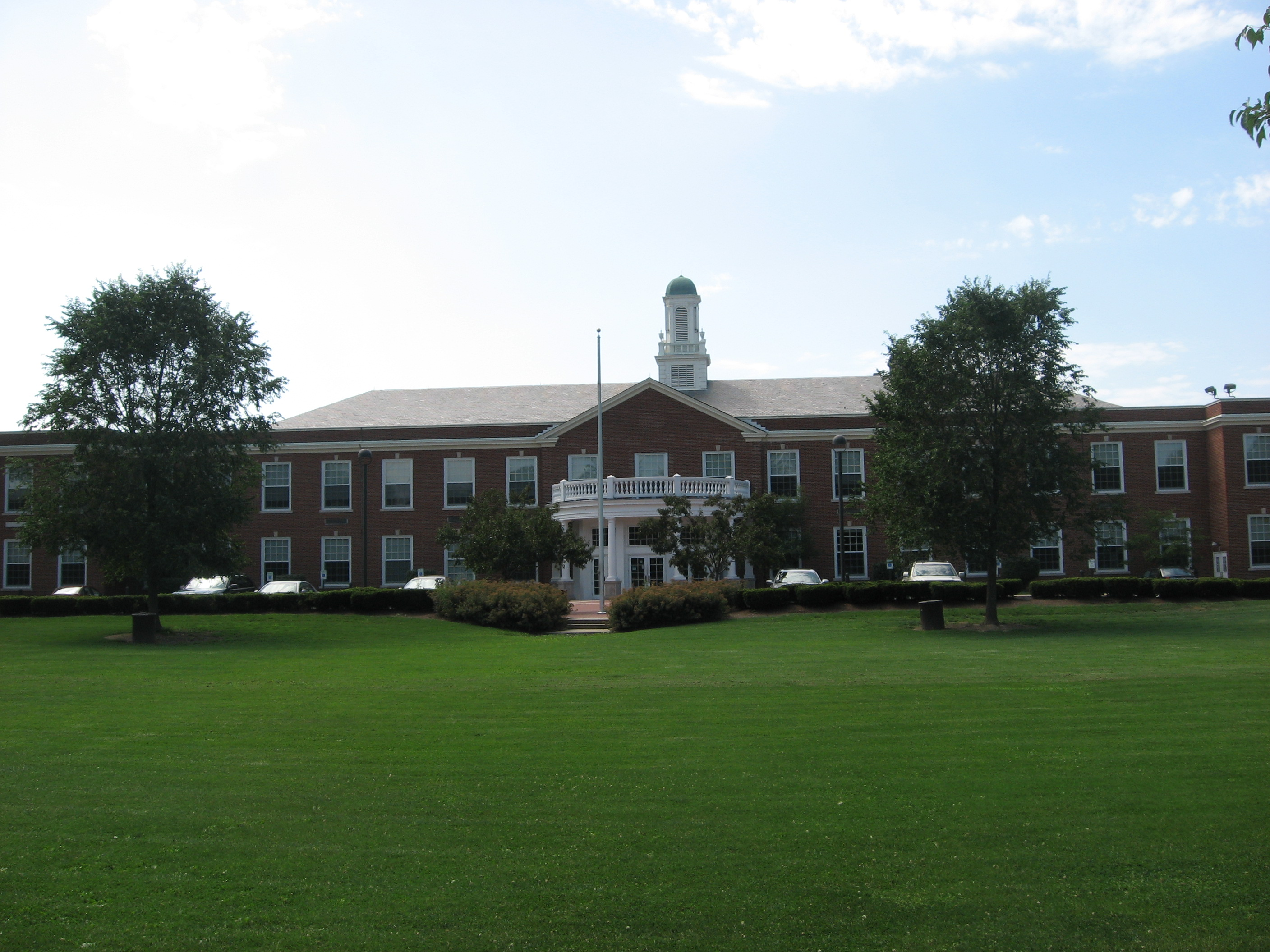

Location
- 15911 Aldersyde Drive; Shaker Heights, (Cuyahoga County), Ohio 44120; United States; 41°28′24″N 81°34′9″W

Information
- Type: Public high school
- Motto: "A community is known by the schools it keeps"
- Established: 1918
- School district: Shaker Heights City School District
- Superintendent: David Glasner
- School code: 361395
- Teaching staff: 108.60 (FTE)
- Grades: 9–12
- Enrollment: 1,474 (2023–2024)
- Student to teacher ratio: 13.57
- Colors: Red; White
- Song: To Shaker We Belong
- Athletics conference: Greater Cleveland Conference
- Mascot: The Raider “Tuffy”
- Team name: Raiders
- Accreditation: North Central Association of Colleges and Schools
- Newspaper: The Shakerite
- Yearbook: Gristmill
- Communities served: Shaker Heights; parts of Cleveland
- Website: shhs.shaker.org

Shaker Heights High School is a public high school located in Shaker Heights, Ohio, a suburb of Cleveland. The high school is the only public high school in the Shaker Heights City School District, which serves Shaker Heights and a small part of Cleveland. Shaker Heights High School is an International Baccalaureate World School, the only public high school in Cuyahoga County to hold this accreditation and offer rigorous IB classes. The school colors are red and white and its mascot is Tuffy the Raider.

== Demographics ==
Although the population of Shaker Heights is 55% White, 37% African American and 8% Asian or other, The Shaker Heights City School District's approximate enrollment is 48% African American, 40% White and 12% Asian, Hispanic, multiracial or other. The school has received national attention for its efforts to close the gap between achievements of ethnic and racial minority students and non-ethnic and racial minority students. One of the most active organizations at the school is the Student Group on Race Relations (SGORR), which helps foster positive race relations and fight against racial injustice. Founded in 1983, the group has high school students visit elementary schools to "promote good social relations among racially diverse children." SGORR received recognition from the Human Relations Commission of Shaker Heights and the Ohio Governor's Youth Award for Peace, as well as being a finalist for the Isaiah Award of the American Jewish Committee.

In addition, as a way to help narrow the achievement gap, the Minority Achievement Committee scholars/sisters program was established in 1990. The program has 11th and 12th grade high achieving African Americans mentor and serve as role models to underachieving minority students in lower grades using five core values: respect, pride, honesty, sensitivity, and confidence.

== Academic program ==
Shaker Heights High School offers 23 Advanced Placement courses, the largest advanced Advanced Placement in Cuyahoga County. In 2009, 153 students, 38% of students taking Advanced Placement exams, won Advanced Placement Awards because of high scoring on multiple exams, a record for the school. The high school began offering International Baccalaureate courses in 2010 and is the only public high school in Cuyahoga County to hold this accreditation. The first class of International Baccalaureate Diploma candidates graduated in 2012. The district estimates that roughly 90% of Shaker High graduates attend college. The high school ranks in the top 2% of high schools in the country by Newsweek Magazine, whose rankings are based on the number of Advanced Placement and International Baccalaureate exams taken.

Shaker Heights High School sports a science wing with a roughly fifty-seat planetarium and several laboratory rooms. Sciences offered include astronomy, biology, chemistry, geology, engineering applications, environmental science, oceanography, project physics and engineering, and physics.

In addition to English, the school offers six world languages, more than any other public high school in Cuyahoga County, including Chinese, French, German, Latin, and Spanish. The high school has a Confucius Classroom supported by the Confucius Institute and the Office of Chinese Language Council International (Hanban). The high school also serves as a location for a Chinese language immersion camp affiliated with Ohio State University. The high school has two-week-long student exchange programs with the Universidad del Valle de México in Mexico City, Mexico and a semester-long program with the Ratsgymnasium in Goslar, Germany. Through other student exchange programs such as the American Field Service, United States Department of State and World Learning, Shaker Heights High School has hosted students for over five decades from dozens of nations, including Argentina, Austria, Belgium, Chile, Colombia, Denmark, Finland, France, Germany, Ghana, Greenland, Hong Kong, Indonesia, Italy, Japan, Kenya, Mexico, New Zealand, Pakistan, Russia, Serbia, Slovakia, Thailand, Turkey, and the United Kingdom.

The Asian studies class is offered in cooperation with Beachwood High School and the Cleveland Museum of Art. The program focuses on the history, literature, art, politics, and contemporary society of China, Japan, and India. Students in the class are offered an opportunity to travel to those three countries in the year they are studied.

== Extracurricular activities ==
Shaker Heights High School has a variety of extracurricular activities for languages, sports, the arts, and other areas.

=== Band Program ===
As of 2023, the marching band has more than 300 musicians, and is one of the largest student organizations in the high school, as well as the largest marching band in Ohio. This number also includes the Raiderettes, a dance team that performs with the band.

The marching band went on a trip to Beijing and Shanghai, China in late March and early April 2007, and performs internationally every three years. The bands, orchestra, and choruses also travel abroad periodically, both to perform and to see cultural landmarks. The band performed in Austria, Italy and Germany in March 2010, performing in Venice, Brixen, Innsbruck and Salzburg. In 2013, the band traveled to The Republic of Turkey, playing concerts at Robert College and Taksim Square in Istanbul; as well as in Bergama and at the historic ruins of Ephesus. In 2016, the band traveled to Spain to play in Barcelona, Madrid, Valencia and other smaller towns. In 2023, the band traveled to France, playing concerts in Caen, Rouen, and Paris.

The band has band camp a week before school starts, preparing a halftime show for American football games during the fall football season. After the marching band season, the school has five concert bands: one Class AA band, one Class A band, and three Class B bands. In 2013, the AA and A class bands, Wind Ensemble and Symphonic Band, respectively, performed at Severance Hall.

=== Theater Program ===
The Shaker Theatre Arts Department was founded in its present form by former Artistic Director James Thornton, and has prepared many students for successful careers on stage and screen. Shaker Theatre Department offers a variety of classes, allowing the students to have a full view and access to the "circle" of theatre. Classes include Playwriting, Acting, the Ensemble Program, as well as the theatre management classes Theatre Production Seminar and Ensemble Coordination Management Course. The season includes the fall main stage production, the Ninth Grade Theatre Experience (written and performed by the ninth graders), New Stages (the student generated playwriting festival), and the Spring Ensemble Show (a performance consisting of movement theatre and poetry prose performed by the Senior Acting Ensemble, the Advanced Acting Ensemble and the Junior Acting Ensemble). Other Shaker Theatre Showcases include the Theatre Social, Fall Ensemble Preview, Winter Solstice Sharings, and Theatre awards. Every new Broadway season since 1991 has included one or more Shaker Theatre alum in major New York productions. In addition, Shaker Theatre alums hold positions in every area of professional theatre and the entertainment industry.

=== Latin ===
Shaker Heights' Latin Club functions as a local chapter of both the Ohio Junior Classical League (OJCL) and National Junior Classical League (NJCL). In 2010 and 2013, the team placed first in the Academic Per Capita trophy, winning more than 180 individual awards, and in 2014, the team placed first in both the Academic Per Capita competition as well as the Overall Sweepstakes competition, a first in the club's history. The club went on to repeat this feat for the next two years. Shaker Heights High School is noted for its strong performance on the National Latin Examination, with nearly one hundred students receiving recognition for high scores in 2010.

=== The Shakerite ===
The school's student newspaper, The Shakerite, has won numerous awards, including the 2006 Golden Flash Award from the Northeast Ohio Scholastic Press Association and the National Pacemaker Award from the National Scholastic Press Association in 2006. This was the second time The Shakerite received the award. In addition, the paper has received a Gold Medal Award from the Columbia Scholastic Press Association and a First Place Award from the Great Lakes International Press Association.

=== Student Awards ===
Students from Shaker Heights High School have won awards at regional, state and national levels at many academic competitions, including the Federal Reserve Challenge, Math League, Model United Nations competitions, National History Day, Poetry Out Loud, Science Olympiad, The Maltz Museum's Stop the Hate essay contest, TEAMS, United States National Physics Olympiad, and the Vex Robotics Competition.

== Facilities ==
Originally designed by the Cleveland architectural firm of Hubbell & Benes, Shaker Heights High School has a capacity of about 2,000 students and covers 304,400 square feet (28,280 m^{2}). There are 82 regular classrooms, ten combined science lab/classrooms, four art rooms, and two music rooms outfitted with instrument lockers. Athletics facilities include locker rooms, an outdoor track, an outdoor FieldTurf athletic field marked for soccer, American football, lacrosse and field hockey, two baseball fields, a weight room, two indoor gymnasiums, a multipurpose room (with wrestling mats and an indoor batting cage), nine hard tennis courts, a dance studio, and a fencing room. In addition, there is a two-floor cafeteria, a senior lounge, a planetarium, six computer labs, a courtyard and a library. The school has three auditoriums: a large one capable of holding nearly 900 people, a small auditorium, and a black box theater under the large auditorium. The auditoriums were renovated in 2008.

== Athletics ==
Shaker Heights High School has teams in several sports, including baseball, basketball, crew, cross country, diving, fencing, field hockey, figure skating, football, golf, ice hockey, lacrosse, rugby, soccer, softball, swimming, tennis, track and field, volleyball and wrestling. Shaker's neighboring sporting rivals include Cleveland Heights High School, Garfield Heights High School, Solon High School, Mentor High School, University School, and Hathaway Brown. The football stadium is named after Russell H. Rupp, who served as principal of the high school for 26 years.

=== Ohio High School Athletic Association State Championships ===
- Baseball – 1965, 1976
- Ice Hockey – 1981, 1993, 2001, 2013
- Men's Golf – 1958, 1959, 1967
- Men's Track and Field – 1926
- Men's Swimming – 1954
- Wrestling – 1954
- Women's Field Hockey – 1991, 2014

=== Other State Championships ===
- Ice Hockey – 1971, 1972, 1974
- Fencing – 2006
- Men's tennis – 2000
- Women's lacrosse – 2001, 2003
- Chess – 1995
- Boys Rugby Ohio Fall 7s, 2024

== Notable alumni ==
Names are listed chronologically by class year.

- 1930 – William R. Van Aken, politician
- 1935 – Yoko Matsuoka, writer
- 1940 – Dorothy Hart, actress
- 1941 – Samuel Glazer, co-developer of Mr. Coffee
- 1943 – Paul Newman, actor and race car driver
- 1950 – Majel Barrett, actress
- 1950 – Dick Brubaker, NFL wide receiver
- 1955 – Sidney M. Wolfe, drug safety activist
- 1955 – Roger Penske, race car driver, team owner, and business entrepreneur
- 1957 – Peter Bergman, writer and comedian, member of The Firesign Theatre
- 1957 – Harvey Pekar, underground comic book writer, wrote American Splendor and music critic
- 1958 – Jerry Heller, rap manager
- 1961 – Betty Anne Rees, actor
- 1962 – Jeff Gerth, Pulitzer Prize–winning journalist
- 1962 – David Mark Berger, Olympic weightlifter murdered at the 1972 Summer Olympics
- 1963 – Bruce Ratner, real estate developer and owner of the New Jersey Nets
- 1963 – Rich Stotter, football player
- 1964 – Eric Ehrmann, HuffPost columnist and former Rolling Stone feature writer from 1968–72
- 1965 – Stephen Stucker, actor
- 1967 – David Icove, FBI Academy instructor and forensic engineer
- 1969 – Lee Fisher, Ohio lieutenant governor and attorney general, and member of the Ohio Senate and Ohio House of Representatives
- 1971 – Marcia Fudge, U.S. Secretary of Housing and Urban Development and former U.S. Representative
- 1971 – Peter Lawson Jones, Cuyahoga County commissioner
- 1971 – Jane Campbell, mayor of Cleveland, Ohio
- 1972 – Jimmy Malone, WMJI radio host and stand-up comedian
- 1973 – Susan Orlean, writer
- 1974 – Wade Manning, NFL wide receiver
- 1975 – Keith Black, neurosurgeon
- 1976 – Andy Borowitz, comedian and satirist, creator of The Fresh Prince of Bel-Air
- 1978 – John Morris Russell, renowned conductor of the Cincinnati Pops Orchestra
- 1979 – Kym Whitley, actress and comedian
- 1979 – Jim Brickman, musician
- 1979 - Thomas Modly, businessman and former acting United States Secretary of the Navy
- 1981 – Michael Scharf, law professor and director of Frederick K. Cox International
- 1981 – David Pogue, technology writer, journalist and commentator
- 1983 – Marc Kamionkowski, theoretical physicist
- 1984 – Griff Allen, auto racing promoter, broadcaster, engineer
- 1984 – Michael McElroy, Tony-nominated Broadway actor
- 1984 – Gerald Levert, recording artist, member of R&B group LeVert
- 1984 – Caroline Hoxby, labor economist
- 1986 – Sean Levert, recording artist, member of R&B group LeVert
- 1987 – Rebecca Dallet, justice of the Wisconsin Supreme Court
- 1987 – Keith Rucker, NFL defensive tackle
- 1987 – David Wain, comedian, actor, director; cast of The State and member of comedy group Stella
- 1988 – Tracy Nicole Chapman, Broadway actress
- 1989 – Jamie Babbit, television and film director best known for But I'm a Cheerleader
- 1991 – Michelle Federer, Broadway actress, member of the original company of Wicked: The Musical
- 1992 – Kathryn Schulz, author and journalist, winner of 2016 Pulitzer Prize
- 1993 – Carter Bays, Emmy-nominated writer for the Late Show with David Letterman and co-creator, writer, and producer of How I Met Your Mother
- 1995 – Scott Savol, American Idol finalist
- 1996 – Ben Simon, former Columbus Blue Jackets hockey player
- 1996 – Matt Guerrier, pitcher for the Minnesota Twins
- 1998 – Celeste Ng, author of the award-winning and best-selling novels Everything I Never Told You and Little Fires Everywhere
- 1998 – Nate Clements, former NFL cornerback
- 1998 – Nate Fish, former coach for the Israel national baseball team and Israel at the World Baseball Classic
- 1999 – Adrien Clarke, NFL player
- 2002 – Kid Cudi, rapper, transferred to Solon High School
- 2007 – Max Miller, U.S. Representative and former aide to Donald Trump
- 2008 – Wesley Lowery, Washington Post reporter
- 2008 – Machine Gun Kelly, rapper/pop punk musician
- 2012 – Terry Rozier, NBA point guard
- 2019 – Rasheen Ali, NFL running back
- 2021 – Jahdae Walker, NFL wide receiver
