= Great Lakes Mall =

Coordinates: 41°39′28″N 81°21′40″W

- Location: Mentor, Ohio, U.S.
- Opened: January 17, 1961
- Developer: Edward J. DeBartolo Corporation
- Manager: CBRE
- Owner: Washington Prime Group
- Num. of stores: 126
- Num. of anchor tenants: 6 (4 open, 1 vacant, 1 demolished)
- Floor area: 1,249,574 sq ft (116,089 m^{2})
- Floors: 1 (2 in Dillard's, JCPenney, former Macy's, and former Sears, closed 2nd floor in Round One Entertainment)
- Public transit: Laketran
- Website: shopgreatlakesmall.com

Great Lakes Mall is a super-regional shopping mall located in Mentor, Ohio, United States, on U.S. Route 20, approximately 20 miles (32 km) northeast of Cleveland. Anchor stores include Round 1 Entertainment, Dillard's, JCPenney, and Dick's Sporting Goods. With one vacant anchor store that was once housed Macy's. The mall contains 1,249,574 sq ft (116,089 m^{2}).

== History ==
=== Early years: 1961-1979 ===
The mall first opened as an open-air center in January, 1961, developed by the Edward J. DeBartolo Corporation and the Glazer–Marotta Company. Site preparations began in late 1959 transforming a former strawberry field into land viable for a shopping center. At the time of opening, the mall was the largest in the United States. The open-air concept held a JCPenney as its sole anchor store. In 1964, May Company was added. The mall was enclosed, and received another anchor, Higbee's, in the fall of 1969. To add to the anchor lineup, in 1971, Sears opened, and in 1977 Horne's opened; bringing the total of anchor stores to five.

=== Expansion and anchor changes: 1980-1999 ===
In 1988, a multi-million dollar renovation and expansion occurred. New flooring, and lighting was installed, along with a brand new food court. In 1990, Wendall August Forge announced they would be opening a new store concept in the mall, citing how impressed executives were with the remodeled property. In July of that same year, JCPenney agreed to pay $160,150 in a settlement after crews improperly removed asbestos during a renovation in October 1989. In February 1992, Dillard's in collaboration with the Edward J. Debartolo Corp. purchased five Horne's locations; one of which was located at Great Lakes. The location closed in July, and opened as Dillard's in August, 1992. In 1997, the DeBartolo Corporation merged with Simon Property Group, sending the ownership of Great Lakes Mall over to Simon.

=== Washington Prime Group and anchor closures: 2000-2026 ===
On May 28, 2014, it was announced by Simon Property Group that they would transfer Great Lakes Mall to its new spinoff Washington Prime Group. In July 2014, Dick's Sporting Goods opened in between Macy's and JCPenney. In 2015, Sears Holdings spun off 235 of its properties, including the Sears at Great Lakes Mall, into Seritage Growth Properties. Dillard's North closed in May 2017, consolidating the men and women's stores into the Dillard's south location. In July 2017, Round One Entertainment opened in the vacant Dillard's north space. Sears closed in September 2017. Macy's closed in April 2021 as part of a plan to close 46 stores nationwide.

In 2024, the Sears property was purchased by a local real estate developer for $1.5 million. In early 2025, the former Sears Auto Center outbuilding was demolished in order to build a relocated city fire station. On March 31, 2026, Washington Prime Group announced that they would be selling all of their properties as a part of a broad restructuring. Great Lakes was placed for sale, with CBRE being brought into manage the property. In May, demolition began on the Sears anchor building with demolition expected to be complete by late 2026.
