= Marc Mencher =

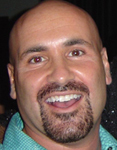
- Marc Mencher, 2008
- Born: 1961 (age 64–65); New York
- Occupation: Game Recruiter
- Years active: since 1994
- Employer: www.GameRecruiter.com

Marc Mencher (born 1961) is an American executive in the video game industry, who has written multiple articles and books about gaming careers, such as the 2003 book Get in the Game: Careers in the Game Industry. He is best known as co-founder and CEO of the recruiting agency GameRecruiter.com, and is a frequent contributor to game developer trade magazines and websites such as Gamasutra.

== Biography ==
Mencher was born in 1961 in New York, the eldest of five children to a schoolteacher and a government adjudicator. The family eventually moved to Ohio, where he attended Shaker Heights High School, and then Cleveland State University, receiving a degree in business in 1984, with a minor in computer science. After college, his first job was with Cincinnati Milacron, where he was eventually put in charge of an AI research project funded by the USAF, in conjunction with Carnegie Mellon University's Robotics Institute. While working at Carnegie Mellon, he saw some of the programmers late at night playing the first networked UNIX-based game, known today as Asteroids. This inspired him to leave Cincinnati Milacron and become involved in the video game industry.

His first gaming job was at Sphere, which was later renamed to Spectrum Holobyte. He worked as a software engineer on the games Vet and Falcon 1. When Spectrum Holobyte merged with MicroProse in 1993, Mencher was asked to staff the entity, and hired over 200 people. He later joined The 3DO Company, a game console manufacturer, as Staffing Manager, and helped to build The 3DO Studio (The 3DO Company's Game Development Studio) from scratch, hiring over 300 people.

In 1996, Mencher decided that he enjoyed the work so much, he opened his own recruiting firm, Virtual Search, which was later renamed to GameRecruiter in 2004, with Mencher as CEO, along with co-founder Howard Taule. The firm specializes in career opportunities within the worldwide gaming industry, and is based in Fort Lauderdale, Florida, with satellite offices in Austin, Texas, Las Vegas, Nevada, San Francisco, and Los Angeles.

While running the recruiting company, Mencher also contributed to the gaming industry as a producer of games such as Nikopol: Secrets of the Immortals and was given special thanks in the credits of: Force 21 and Call of Duty 4: Modern Warfare.

Mencher has written many articles for game industry periodicals and websites such as Gamasutra, with advice and observations on gaming careers. He has also been interviewed as an industry expert on Blog Talk Radio, and in periodicals such as Wall Street Journal, Boston Globe, the Florida Sun-Sentinel and The Washington Post. In 2002, he wrote and published his first book, Get in the Game!. The book guides and prepares readers to start a career in the game industry, and shows the reader how to research, network, meet the right industry people, access the unadvertised job market, and present an effective demo. The book also gives advice for writing resumes, handling interviews, and negotiating salary packages. Additional advice is included from several industry experts who discuss different types of careers in the industry.

== Speaker ==
Mencher is a regular speaker at the Game Developers Conference and other game industry-related events around the United States. He was the keynote speaker at the 2007 IDG World Expo Game Career Seminar, with a talk entitled, "It takes a team: Careers in the Game Industry".

== Organizations and advisory boards ==
Mencher was the president of IGDN, International Game Developers Network, was the former South Florida chapter coordinator for the International Game Developers Association, and is an advisory board member for multiple educational institutions, including Full Sail Real World Education, Westwood College, Keiser University, and the Family of Art Institute Colleges, where he advises local high schools and colleges on curriculum improvement for game-related degrees, including associate, bachelor's and master's degrees in game programming, game art, animation and game design.

== Works ==
=== Books ===
- Mencher, Marc (2003). Get in the Game!, Careers In The Game Industry. New Riders. ISBN 978-0-7357-1307-9.
- (contributor) Saltzman, Marc (2004). Game creation and careers: Insider secrets from industry experts. New Riders. ISBN 978-0-7357-1367-3.

=== Selected articles ===
- "Negotiating your best salary in the game industry". New Riders. November 15, 2002.
- "Deploying your resume and scoring an interview". New Riders. November 22, 2002.
- "Building a great game team: Measuring progress". Gamasutra. October 15, 2008.
- "Recruiting the candidate: Now playing at a theatre near you". Gamasutra. February 14, 2000.
- "Interviewing the candidate: More than a feeling". Gamasutra. January 11, 2000.

=== Games ===
- 1997, Tony Tough, and The Night Of The Roasted Moths, Prograph Research S.r.l. Executive Producer
- 1999, Force 21, Red Storm Entertainment, Special Thanks
- 2001, The Watchmaker, Executive Producer, US Localization Team, Got Game Entertainment
- 2002, Tsunami 2265, Got Game Entertainment, Executive Producer, Publisher
- 2007, Call of Duty 4: Modern Warfare, Activision, Special Thanks
- 2008, Nikopol: Secrets of the Immortals, Technical Producer, Got Game Entertainment
- 2009, Hinterland: Orc Lords, Tilted Mill Entertainment, provided producer and programmer to Tilted Mill Entertainment
