= Renee Gittins =

American game developer (born 1990)

- Born: 1990 (age 35–36)
- Occupation: Executive Director at IGDA

Renee Gittins is an American game developer and former Executive Director of the International Game Developers Association (IGDA), succeeding Jennifer MacLean and succeeded by Dr. Jakin Vela. She also serves as Creative Director at her indie game studio, Stumbling Cat, which is developing the game Potions: A Curious Tale.

== Biography ==
Renee Gittins is the daughter of Carol Gittins and Olympian Boyd Gittins. She received her degree in engineering from Harvey Mudd College in May 2012 and worked in biotechnology prior to joining the game industry.

Prior to her appointment as executive director, Gittins served on the IGDA's executive board as secretary and started her company, Stumbling Cat, in 2014. As Executive Director, Gittins promised to focus on sustainable careers and inclusion within the game industry, and has taken a strong stance against the significant overtime hours worked within the game industry.

Gittins was named as part of the Forbes 30 Under 30 class of 2020 in Games.
