= Prince of Peoria =

American comedy television series

- Genre: Teen sitcom
- Created by: Devin Bunje; Nick Stanton
- Starring: Gavin Lewis; Theodore Barnes; Shelby Simmons; Cynthia Kaye McWilliams
- Composer: Gabriel Mann
- Country of origin: United States
- Original language: English
- No. of seasons: 1 (2 parts)
- No. of episodes: 16 (+ 1 special)

Production
- Executive producers: Devin Bunje; Nick Stanton; Sharla Sumpter Bridgett
- Producer: Chris Phillips
- Cinematography: John Simmons
- Editor: Dave O'Brien
- Camera setup: Multi-camera
- Running time: 24–29 minutes
- Production companies: 37 Monkeys; The Story Co.

Original release
- Network: Netflix
- Release: November 16, 2018 – May 20, 2019

Prince of Peoria is an American teen sitcom created by Devin Bunje and Nick Stanton that premiered on November 16, 2018, on Netflix.

== Premise ==
Prince of Peoria follows "Emil, a 13-year-old prince from a wealthy island kingdom" who "travels to the United States to live incognito as an exchange student" and "strikes up an unlikely friendship with Teddy, a fastidious overachiever who is Emil’s total opposite."

== Cast and characters ==
=== Main ===
- Gavin Lewis as Prince Maxemil "Emil" Vanderklaut III, a prince from Buronia who plays a foreign exchange student
- Theodore Barnes as Teddy Jackson, a smart kid who cares more about his education than making friends
- Shelby Simmons as Sydney Quinn, Teddy's crush who discovers Emil's real identity and helps him keep it a secret
- Cynthia Kaye McWilliams as Regina Jackson, the owner of the Spare Time Bowl bowling alley and Teddy's widowed mother

=== Recurring ===
- Haley Tju as Braughner, Sydney's friend
- Gabriel Hogan as Joosep, Emil's dimwitted bodyguard
- Conor Husting as Tanner, a boy Sydney used to date
- Kyle More as Wade, an employee at Spare Time Bowl
- Johnathan McClain as King of Buronia
- Nate Torrence as Vice Principal Chipler
- Brooke Star as Autumn McCrary
- Chelsea Summer as Summer McCrary
- Zach Zagoria as Stank Man
- Jared Wernick as Daryl

=== Guest ===
- David Shatraw as Fabian La Fab ("A Night at the Hip Hopera")
- Ricardo Hurtado as Rafael ("The Bro-Posal")
- Tia Mowry as Meghan ("Game Night"), one of Sydney's moms who went to MIT
- Sophie Reynolds as Ryan Gibson ("Robot Wars"), Teddy's archenemy

== Episodes ==
Series overview
Season	Episodes	Originally released
Part 1	8	November 16, 2018
Special	1	December 17, 2018
Part 2	8	May 20, 2019

No. overall	No. in season	Title	Directed by	Written by	Original release date
Part 1
1	1	"The Prince Arrives"	Eric Dean Seaton	Devin Bunje & Nick Stanton	November 16, 2018
Regina has signed them up to house an exchange student. When the exchange student arrives Teddy isn't too sure about him. As the kid says he is the son of a moose farmer, but the story doesn't add up.
2	2	"Teddy vs. The Wild"	Eric Dean Seaton	Leo Chu & Eric S. Garcia	November 16, 2018
Emil believes Teddy needs to loosen up. But what should be a fun filled camping trip ends up more stressful than planned.
3	3	"Emil the Mom Thief"	Eric Dean Seaton	Peter Dirksen & Jonathan Howard	November 16, 2018
4	4	"A Night at the Hip Hopera"	Jonathan Judge	Randi Barnes	November 16, 2018
5	5	"Teddy's Bakshal"	Jody Margolin Hahn	Jason Jordan	November 16, 2018
6	6	"Warehouse Towel Fight!"	Jon Rosenbaum	Marty Donovan	November 16, 2018
7	7	"Best. Holiday. Ever."	Phill Lewis	Lindsay Gelfand & Allison Weintraub	November 16, 2018
8	8	"The Bro-Posal"	Jason Earles	Devin Bunje & Nick Stanton	November 16, 2018
Special
–	–	"A Christmas Moose Miracle"	Jon Rosenbaum	Devin Bunje & Nick Stanton	December 17, 2018
Part 2
9	1	"The King Arrives"	Phill Lewis	Leo Chu & Eric S. Garcia	May 20, 2019
10	2	"Daters Gonna Date"	Jody Margolin Hahn	Lindsay Gelfand & Allison Weintraub	May 20, 2019
11	3	"Acting a Fool"	Jonathan Judge	Jonathan Howard & Peter Dirksen	May 20, 2019
12	4	"Saving Stank Nation"	Sean Lambert	Jason Jordan	May 20, 2019
13	5	"Game Night"	Lynn McCracken	Randi Barnes	May 20, 2019
14	6	"Robot Wars"	Jody Margolin Hahn	Marty Donovan	May 20, 2019
15	7	"Teddy the Human Cannonball"	Sean Lambert	Conor Hanney	May 20, 2019
16	8	"The Summer of Teddy & Emil"	Eric Dean Seaton	Devin Bunje & Nick Stanton	May 20, 2019

== Production ==
=== Development ===
The series was created by Gamer's Guide to Pretty Much Everything creators Devin Bunje and Nick Stanton, who also acted as writers, showrunners, and executive producers. Additional executive producers included Sharla Sumpter Bridgett and Tim Story.

=== Casting ===
On April 2, 2018, it was announced that Gavin Lewis, Theodore Barnes, Shelby Simmons, and Cynthia Kaye McWilliams had joined the main cast.
