= Vincent Marotta =

American inventor and businessman (1924–2015)

Vincent Marotta Sr.
- Born: February 22, 1924; Cleveland, Ohio, US
- Died: August 1, 2015 (aged 91); Pepper Pike, Ohio, US
- Occupations: Businessman, investor, philanthropist
- Known for: Developer of Mr. Coffee; Co-founder of North American Systems
- Spouse: Ann Marotta (m. 1954–2015)
- Children: 6

Vincent George Marotta Sr. (February 22, 1924 – August 1, 2015) was an American businessman, investor and philanthropist. He was the co-creator of Mr. Coffee, one of the first automatic drip coffee makers to be introduced to the American consumer market. Marotta, who conceived the idea for the Mr. Coffee machine, developed it with his business partner, Samuel Glazer, to replace the slower, more challenging percolator for use in homes. Marotta and Glazer began marketing Mr. Coffee in 1972. Marotta, who was responsible for much of the company's marketing as chairman and CEO, recruited Joe DiMaggio to appear in a series of Mr. Coffee television commercials. By 1979, just seven years after its launch, sales of Mr. Coffee accounted for 50% of the U.S. consumer coffee maker market at $150 million.

== Biography ==
Marotta was born Vincent George Marotta in Cleveland, Ohio, on February 22, 1924, to Italian immigrant parents, Calogero "Charles" Marotta, a coal dealer, and the former Josephine Mirabella. Marotta was born on February 22, the birthday of George Washington, so his parents chose George as his middle name.

Marotta, an athlete, completed high school. In 1942, Marotta was signed as center fielder for the St. Louis Cardinals. However, Marotta enlisted in the U.S. Army during World War II just before spring training and never played professionally for the Cardinals. He served in a domestic capacity during the war. He completed his bachelor's degree in history at Mount Union College, now called the University of Mount Union, in Alliance, Ohio.

He returned to professional athletics in 1948, when he was drafted by both the Cleveland Browns of the now defunct All-America Football Conference and the New York Giants of the National Football League. He decided to play for the Cleveland Browns as a running back. Marotta retired in 1951.

== Mr. Coffee ==
Marotta left the Browns after a short period. He soon partnered with a friend, Samuel Glazer, a housing and mall developer, whom Marotta had known since high school. Glazer and Marotta established North American Systems, with Marotta serving as the company's chairman and CEO from creation until the partners sold the company in 1987.

However, a credit crunch in 1968 made real estate financing much more difficult to obtain, which hurt Glazer and Marotta's business. Marotta pondered an alternative to the real estate business due to the credit squeeze of 1968. His thoughts turned to a new, potential household coffee maker. During the late 1960s, the coffee percolator, a mainstay in American homes, was the consumer alternative to instant coffee. Many drinkers disliked the coffee brewed by the common household percolator. A percolator drains the same water through the coffee grounds over and over, resulting in a bitter taste as some grounds are used three or four times. Marotta and his partner sought to replicate a coffeemaker based on the drip coffee makers utilized in restaurants and other commercial establishments, but not available to consumers. His wife, Ann Marotta, who also disliked the coffee available at the time, became an inspiration for Marotta's new business plan as well, according to their daughter, Susan Parente.

Marotta created the prototype for his drip coffee machine, which would come to be called Mr. Coffee. He spent approximately three years "searching for 'a mechanical means of controlling the time and temperature of the water' in a coffeemaker," according to his October 1979 interview with Forbes magazine. He compared his work with that of Michelangelo.

Glazer and Marotta hired two former Westinghouse engineers, Edmund Abel and Erwin Schulze, to design a drip coffee machine for household use. Abel and Schultze designed a machine dripping filtered water, heated to 200 degrees Fahrenheit, through coffee grounds scooped into a paper coffee filter. The coffee is then dispensed into a glass carafe.

Marotta and Glazer manufactured their Mr. Coffee machine under their company, North American Systems. North American Systems debuted Mr. Coffee in the U.S. consumer market in 1972. The maker was priced at $39.99, equal to $226 in 2015 dollars, but the machine proved a hit with consumers. To market the product, Marotta recruited baseball player Joe DiMaggio as Mr. Coffee's spokesman. DiMaggio's commercials were popular, though in reality, DiMaggio rarely drank coffee due to ulcers.

North American Systems sold more than a million Mr. Coffee machines by 1975. Total sales reached $50 million by 1979, with Mr. Coffee machines accounting for 50% of the U.S. consumer coffee maker market that year. Glazer and Marotta headed Mr. Coffee's parent company until 1987, when North American Systems was acquired by a securities firm in a leveraged buyout worth $82 million.

== Later life ==
Marotta concentrated on philanthropic pursuits and real estate investing during his later life. In addition to his home in Ohio, Marotta and his wife resided at homes in Frenchman's Creek in Palm Beach Gardens, Florida, and the Bear's Club in Jupiter, Florida, for more than 20 years.

Samuel Glazer, his business partner and the co-developer of Mr. Coffee, died in March 2012.

Vincent Marotta died at his home in Pepper Pike, Ohio, on August 1, 2015, at the age of 91. He was survived by his wife, Ann Laughlin, whom he had married in 1954, and his six children: Mary Marotta, Jane Marotta, Susan Parente, Charles Marotta, Timothy Marotta Sr., and Vincent Marotta Jr.
