= International Game Developers Association =

US nonprofit professional association

International Game Developers Association (IGDA)
- Formation: 1994; 32 years ago (as Computer Game Developers Association)
- Type: 501(c)(6) organisation
- Purpose: Computer games and interactive media
- Region served: Worldwide
- Members: Over 12,000
- Executive Director: Jakin Vela (since 2022)
- Chair of board of directors: Margaret Krohn (2023)
- Website: igda.org

The International Game Developers Association (IGDA) is a nonprofit professional association whose stated mission is to "support and empower game developers around the world in achieving fulfilling and sustainable careers."

The IGDA is incorporated in the United States as a 501(c)(6) nonprofit organization. It has over 12,000 members from all fields of game development. In recognition of the wide-ranging, multidisciplinary nature of interactive entertainment, everyone who participates in any way in the game development process is welcome to join the IGDA.

== History ==
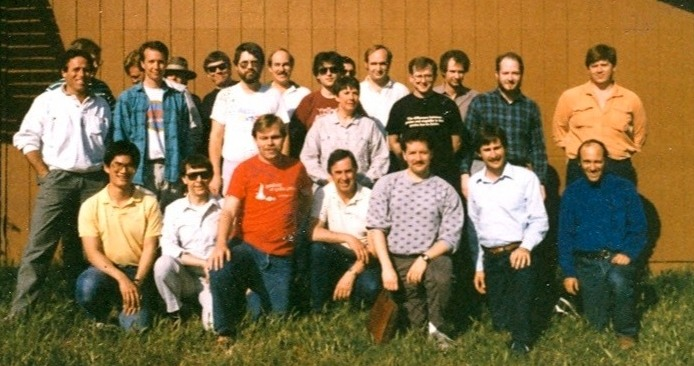
Attendees at the April 1988 Computer Game Developers Conference

The beginnings of the IGDA emerged from several other organizations for computer game developers which were forming in the late 1980s and early 1990s:

- The Computer Game Designers Symposium, later known as the Computer Game Developers Conference, was started in 1988 by Chris Crawford. He had already been producing a bimonthly newsletter for game developers, The Journal of Computer Game Design, since 1987. One of the subscribers, game programmer Nicky Robinson, suggested that he hold a gathering. Crawford took her suggestion, made announcements in two issues of the journal, and hosted the first event in April 1988 in his living room in San Jose, California.
- The Los Angeles Computer Game Developers meetings, 1989–1991, created by Richard Pferdner and David Walker
- The Bay Area Computer Entertainment Developers meetings, 1991–1993, created by Tim Brengle and David Walker, which met monthly
  - In 1992, in response to a need for a professional organization, Brengle and Walker also created the Computer Entertainment Developers Association. Dues were $75/year, and included a subscription to Crawford's Journal of Computer Game Design. CEDA gained members both locally and internationally.

Crawford's living room event in April 1988, the CGDC, had brought in 26 or 27 game developers. It was such a success that on the spot a steering committee was formed to host a larger event six months later at a Holiday Inn in Milpitas, California, which drew 127 developers. Then this event continued to be held each Spring. It grew rapidly, by 50% or more each year, moving to larger and larger venues. Early conference directors included developers such as Crawford, Brenda Laurel, Nicky Robinson, Anne Westfall, and Ernest W. Adams.

In 1994 the CGDC then sponsored its own association, the Computer Game Developers Association, or CGDA, taking over the membership list from Walker and Brengle's CEDA. Initial board members included David Walker, Tim Brengle, Anne Westfall, and Ernest Adams, who became Chair. Jennifer Pahlka became the first Executive Director. In 1997 when elections were held, Noah Falstein became the first elected chair.

A separate organization was also created in 1996, the IGDN, International Game Developers Network, run by people such as Marc Mencher and Gordon Walton. It had its own conference, the International Game Developers Network Conference, launched in 1998 in Austin, Texas.

The two organizations, the CGDA and the IGDN, ran more or less in parallel for a while, and then merged in 1999 as the International Game Developers Association, with David Walker and Tim Brengle as members No. 1 and 2. Hap Aziz on the board of the CGDA and David Weinstein on the board of the IGDN were tasked with merging the two organizations and named the IGDA as a combination of the CGDA and the IGDN.

== Structure ==
The board of directors is the governing body of the IGDA. As of 2023, Margaret Krohn is the chair of the board of directors.

Day-to-day operations of the IGDA are handled by Executive Directors. Since 1994, these have been:

- Jennifer Pahlka, 1994
- Jason Della Rocca, 2000
- Joshua Caulfield, 2009
- Gordon Bellamy, 2010
- Kate Edwards, 2012
- Jennifer MacLean, 2017
- Renee Gittins, 2019–2022
- Jakin Vela, 2022–present

Other structures within the IGDA include:

- Chapters, intended to provide an informal way to connect game developers within local communities. Chapters vary greatly in size and meeting attendance. They provide forums, for example, for discussions on current issues in the computer gaming industry and demos of the latest games.
- Special Interest Groups, better known as SIGs, are intended to spark developer interest in a specific topics or disciplines. For example, the Game Education SIG has a stated mission "To create a community resource that will strengthen the academic membership of the IGDA while enhancing the education of future and current game developers." Some SIGs sponsor events, such as creating the Global Game Jam.
- Committees are generally formed by the IGDA to conduct research into a subject, normally for a short period, leading to a single report. Some, however, are semi-permanent, and produce yearly reports. Some of these reports lead to gaming industry standards.

== Advocacy ==
Aside from bringing game developers together, the IGDA focuses on the following issues present in the game development industry:

- Quality of life – making the process of game development easier and more pleasant for everyone.
- Diversity – ensuring that people from a wide range of backgrounds and their needs are represented in the game development industry
- Anti-Censorship – recognizing games as an art form, and as a medium of expression
- Business and Legal Issues – empowering the development community with business knowledge and advocating for developers
- Student and Academic Relations – setting curriculum guidelines, enhancing collaboration between industry and academia and providing guidance to students wanting a career in games

Starting in 2014, the association has been working with the FBI to deal with the online harassment of developers.

The IGDA introduced the first annual Global Industry Game Awards (GIGA) in August 2021, in collaboration with devcom, a branch of the annual Gamescom convention devoted to video game development. The awards were designed "to celebrate the contributions of individuals and discipline teams across the many facets of game development", with several awards given in each category of Art, Audio, Design, Engineering and Technology, Support, Writing and Narrative, and other awards, rather than focusing on the whole studio behind a given game.

== Programs ==
The IGDA, through its chapters and SIGs, organizes hundreds of events for members of the game development industry including chapter meetings and meetups. However, there are larger events that are organized that bring IGDA's international members together:

- IGDA Summit – The IGDA Summit highlights the expertise, insights and experience of the global IGDA membership – from board members and staff to key volunteers and engaged members.
- IGDA Scholars Program – The IGDA Scholars Program is a program that awards promising students in game development and related disciplines passes to key conferences related to game development (e.g. Game Developers Conference and the Electronic Entertainment Expo) and includes mentorship from key members of the game development industry, opportunities to visit local studios or meetings with senior figures in the industry.
- IGDA Leadership Track at Southern Interactive Entertainment and Game Expo (SIEGE) – The IGDA Leadership Track at SIEGE will encompass a broad range of topics pertinent to the heads of game studios.
- IGDA Global Mentorship Program – As described on the IGDA website: it "provides a way for IGDA members to support each other and to progress their career. The program allows for mentees to get advice from people in their field and mentors to practice mentorship and build relationships."

=== Events ===
- Global Game Jam – Now managed by the Global Game Jam, Inc., the Global Game Jam is an event that organizes developers, artists and game designers to create games within a 48-hour period.
- IGDA Leadership Forum – Focuses on advancing the state of the art in game production and management and encompasses a broad range of leadership topics relevant to game development.

== Controversies ==
In 2009, Timothy Langdell resigned from the IGDA board after a movement to remove him due to his activities in enforcing the trademark name "Edge" used by Edge Games.

During the GDC 2013 a party was hosted by co-presenters IGDA and the start-up incubator YetiZen. The event featured at least three girls in white outfits dancing, one was in a shorter t-shirt, another in a furry outfit. Backlash over the presence of these female dancers resulted in the several people resigning in protest, most notably Brenda Romero from the IGDA's Women in Games Special Interest Group steering committee. On the day following the party IGDA Executive Director Kate Edwards issued an apology stating "We regret that the IGDA was involved in this situation. We do not condone activities that objectify or demean women or any other group of people."

On 20 November 2014 the IGDA added a link to "A Twitter tool to block some of the worst offenders in the recent wave of harassment" to their Online Harassment Resources web page. However, due to the method of the list's generation several IGDA members including the Chairman of IGDA Puerto Rico Roberto Rosario were added to the list of harassers. These errors resulted in the IGDA removing the link to the tool on 22 November.
