= Quarter (film) =

- Theatrical release poster
- Directed by: Kelsey Bascom; Arnon Manor
- Written by: Kelsey Bascom
- Produced by: Kelsey Bascom; Arnon Manor; Bri Lageyre; Krista Minto
- Starring: Kelsey Bascom; Brooke Shields; Ali Wentworth; Raven-Symoné; Tati Gabrielle; Breckin Meyer; Matty Cardarople; Mindy Sterling; Dot-Marie Jones; Derek Theler; Brec Bassinger; Arden Myrin; Gavin Lewis; Eric Roberts
- Cinematography: Eszter Csepeli
- Edited by: Kelsey Bascom; Arnon Manor; Sharidan Sotelo
- Music by: Jordan Hart
- Production company: Chemical Soup Productions
- Distributed by: Chemical Soup Productions
- Release date: November 13, 2026
- Country: United States
- Language: English

Quarter is a 2026 American coming-of-age comedy-drama film directed by Kelsey Bascom and Arnon Manor and written by Bascom. Bascom also stars alongside Brooke Shields, Ali Wentworth, Raven-Symoné, Tati Gabrielle, Breckin Meyer, Matty Cardarople, Mindy Sterling, Dot-Marie Jones, Derek Theler, Brec Bassinger, Arden Myrin, Gavin Lewis, and Eric Roberts.

The film was released in the United States on November 13, 2026.

== Premise ==
Kelly, a young woman living with type 1 diabetes who, in the days leading up to her 25th birthday, navigates the highs and lows of her blood sugar and her personal life.

== Cast ==
- Kelsey Bascom as Kelly
- Brooke Shields as Dr. Wright
- Ali Wentworth as Ali
- Raven-Symoné as Dr. Anderson
- Tati Gabrielle as Elle
- Breckin Meyer as Jim
- Matty Cardarople as Kyle
- Mindy Sterling as Liz
- Dot-Marie Jones as Annie
- Derek Theler as Dylan
- Brec Bassinger as Julie
- Arden Myrin as Diane
- Gavin Lewis as Nick
- Eric Roberts as Dr. Miller
- Nick Creegan as Brian

== Production ==
In February 2024, it was reported that a coming-of-age comedy-drama film titled Quarter was in development by filmmakers Kelsey Bascom and Arnon Manor, with Brooke Shields, Ali Wentworth, Raven-Symoné, Tati Gabrielle, Breckin Meyer, Matty Cardarople, Mindy Sterling, Dot-Marie Jones, Derek Theler, Brec Bassinger, Arden Myrin, Eric Roberts, Gavin Lewis, and Nick Creegan joining the cast. Principal photography began in September 2024.

== Release ==
Quarter was released in the United States on November 13, 2026.
