= Pilar Savone =

American film producer and assistant director

- Born: June 16, 1971 (age 54)
- Occupations: Film producer, assistant director, production coordinator
- Years active: 1997–present

Pilar Savone (born June 16, 1971) is an American film producer and assistant director. She was nominated for the Academy Award for Best Picture for the 2012 film Django Unchained at the 85th Academy Awards in 2013, along with fellow producers Stacey Sher and Reginald Hudlin. As of 2025, Savone is an executive vice president of production and development at Simpson Street.

== Filmography ==
=== Film ===
Year	Film	Served as	Awards and nominations	Ref
1997	Jackie Brown	Assistant director		
1997	The Last Time I Committed Suicide	Assistant director		
1998	Milo	Production coordinator		
1999	The Minus Man	Assistant director		
1999	Arlington Road	Assistant director		
2001	Spy Game	Assistant director		
2003	Kill Bill: Volume 1	Assistant		
2004	Kill Bill: Volume 2	Assistant		
2005	Hostel	Assistant		
2007	Grindhouse	Associate producer		
2009	Inglourious Basterds	Associate producer		
2012	Django Unchained	Producer	Nominated – Academy Award for Best Picture; Nominated – Producers Guild of America Award for Best Theatrical Motion Picture	
2016	Run the Tide	Producer		

=== Television ===
Year	Film	Served as
1998	Legion	Production coordinator
2001	One Hell of a Guy	Assistant director
2020	Little Fires Everywhere	Executive Producer
