= Our Missing Hearts =

Book by Celeste Ng

- Author: Celeste Ng
- Language: English
- Genre: Fiction
- Published: 2022
- Publisher: Penguin Press
- Publication place: United States
- Pages: 335
- ISBN: 978-1408716915

Our Missing Hearts is the third novel by the American author Celeste Ng. It was published in 2022 by Penguin Press. The novel follows 12 year old Noah Gardner (known as Bird) as he unravels intimate and societal histories from Cambridge, Massachusetts, where he lives with his father, to New York City in search for his mother, a Chinese American poet who left the family 3 years ago. The novel takes place in a dystopian future under PACT (The Preserving American Culture and Traditions Act). It explores the beautiful, tenuous and shocking possibilities between small acts and larger stories that make up the worlds we allow and those that allow us to exist.
