= Laketran =

Transit agency of Lake County, Ohio

- Founded: 1974
- Headquarters: 555 Lakeshore Boulevard; Painesville, Ohio
- Service area: Lake County
- Service type: Bus
- Alliance: Free transfer with Greater Cleveland RTA
- Routes: Local Routes:1-14, Park-n-Ride:10-13
- Fleet: 2016, 2018 MCI; 2021 New Flyer; paratransit buses
- Daily ridership: 3,000 (weekdays, Q4 2025)
- Annual ridership: 698,500 (2025)
- Fuel type: Diesel, propane, battery
- Chief executive: Ben Capelle
- Website: laketran.com

Laketran is the transit agency that serves Lake County, Ohio, the county northeast of Cleveland. It is the third-largest transit system in Northeast Ohio, serving Mentor, Painesville, Willoughby, Wickliffe. Eastlake, Fairport Harbor, Madison and other Lake County destinations. In 2025, the system had a ridership of 698,500, or about 3,000 per weekday as of the fourth quarter of 2025.

Laketran was established as the Regional Transit Authority for Lake County in 1974. Laketran's services include local Routes 1–14, Park-n-Ride Routes 10–13, commuter express routes to downtown Cleveland, and Dial-a-Ride, a door-to-door demand response paratransit service.

Laketran is funded by a 0.5% sales tax, fare revenue, Federal aid for capital expenses, and State assistance.

Laketran received an Outstanding Achievement Award from the American Public Transportation Association (APTA) for systems carrying more than one million passengers annually, twice: in 2000 and 2005. Laketran connects to Greater Cleveland RTA at Shoregate Shopping Center (Route #39) and at East 276th Street and Euclid Avenue (Route #28).

With the addition of the New Flyer C35LF, Laketran also operates a fleet of MCI (Motor Coach Industries) D4000's for Park-n-Ride commuter service to and from Cleveland. Laketran also operates a fleet of cutaway buses manufactured by Tesco Bus on light routes and Dial-a-Ride paratransit service. In 2009, Laketran purchased a fleet of New Flyer XN35s and are currently being phased out and replaced with 2021 New Flyer diesel and battery powered buses. Laketran also operates a fleet of smaller size low floor Gillig buses purchased in 2010. In 2017, Laketran introduced propane-fueled paratransit vans to its Dial-a-Ride fleet. In 2021, Laketran became the first transit agency in Ohio to operate all electric buses from New Flyer.

Laketran's hours of operation for local routes are Monday-Friday: 5am-9pm, Saturday: 6am-9pm, and Sunday Dial-A-Ride only: 7am-7pm. Laketran is open on Martin Luther King Day, Presidents' Day, Columbus Day and Veterans Day and closed for the remaining federal holidays.

== Routes ==
- – Painesville, Mentor, Great Lakes Mall, Lakeland Community College
- – Mentor, Willoughby, Wickliffe, Euclid
- – Great Lakes Mall, Lakeland Community College, Mentor – Wickliffe
- – Madison, Painesville
- – Fairport & Painesville Circulators
- – Shops of Willoughby Hills, Shoregate, Lakeland Community College, Great Lakes Mall via Vine St.
- – Campus Loop
- – Mentor, Mentor-on-the-Lake, Mentor Headlands, Painesville Township
- – Painesville, Diamond Centre, Heisley Rd, Tyler Blvd, Great Lakes Mall, Lakeland Community College
- – Mentor Market Street Park-n-Ride
- – Madison Park-n-Ride, Lakeland Community College Park-n-Ride
- – Eastlake Transit Center, St. Mary Magdalene, Shoregate, Wickliffe Park-n-Ride
- – Painesville Township Park-n-Ride, Mentor Park-n-Ride, Wickliffe Park-n-Ride, University Circle
- – Storm Shuttle

== See also ==
- List of bus transit systems in the United States
