= Wade Manning =

American football player (born 1955)

No. 22, 83
- Position: Wide receiver / Defensive back

Personal information
- Born: July 25, 1955 (age 71); Meadville, Pennsylvania, U.S.
- Listed height: 5 ft 11 in (1.80 m)
- Listed weight: 190 lb (86 kg)

Career information
- High school: Shaker Heights (OH)
- College: Ohio State (baseball)
- NFL draft: 1979: undrafted

Career history
- Dallas Cowboys (1979–1980); Buffalo Bills (1981)*; Denver Broncos (1981–1982); Denver Gold (1984)*; Cleveland Browns (1984)*; Denver Broncos (1985)*
- * Offseason or practice squad member only

Awards and highlights
- Baseball All-Big Ten (1978)

Career NFL statistics
- Games played: 34
- Stats at Pro Football Reference

Wade Ronald Arthur Manning (born July 27, 1955) is an American former professional football player who was a wide receiver in the National Football League (NFL) for the Dallas Cowboys and Denver Broncos. He played college baseball for the Ohio State Buckeyes.

== Early life ==
Manning attended Shaker Heights High School where he played baseball and football. He was an outstanding baseball player that was selected by the Cleveland Indians. In football he played as a safety.

In his first year out of high school he worked as a clerk and draftsman for an engineering firm. The next year he studied at John Carroll University. He then transferred to Ohio State University on an engineering scholarship.

He walked-on and eventually earned a scholarship to play for the baseball team. His position was center field and as a senior he registered a .325 batting average, 6 home runs (led the team) and a school record 23-out-of-25 stolen bases. He finished his college career with 44 stolen bases. He was selected in the 30th round of the 1976 MLB Amateur Draft by the Pittsburgh Pirates.

== Professional career ==
=== Dallas Cowboys ===
Although he never played a down of college football, he signed with the Dallas Cowboys as an undrafted free agent in 1979, following in the foot steps of Cornell Green, Peter Gent, Percy Howard, Ken Johnson and Ron Howard, as players that were converted by the Cowboys to play professional football. Capitalizing on his great speed, he made the team as a kickoff returner. In the second game against the San Francisco 49ers, he suffered a stretched hamstring tendon above his left knee and was placed on the injured reserve list after the fifth game. He was reactivated in the 13th game to replace linebacker Thomas Henderson. In the season finale he helped set up the winning drive with a 17 punt return (the longest of the year for Cowboys) against the Philadelphia Eagles.

In 1980, he was placed on the injured reserve list with a right knee injury on September 2. On August 19, 1981, he was traded to the Buffalo Bills in exchange for an eighth round draft pick (#216-George Peoples).

=== Buffalo Bills ===
On August 22, 1981, the Buffalo Bills traded him to the Denver Broncos in exchange for an eighth round draft choice (not exercised).

=== Denver Broncos (first stint) ===
After the Denver Broncos switched him to wide receiver, he led the team in punt returns with 378 yards (9.2 average), which ranked sixth in the American Football Conference. He was waived on August 30, 1983.

=== Denver Gold ===
On October 18, 1983, he signed with the Denver Gold of the United States Football League. He was released on February 13, 1984.

=== Denver Broncos (second stint) ===
The Denver Broncos signed him as a free agent on February 11, 1985. He was cut on August 20.

== Personal life ==
Manning is currently a teacher at Smoky Hill High School and his focus is mostly in the Athletic Department. He married and had two children, Madison and Nick Manning.
