= Tsunami 2265 =

2002 video game

- Developer: Prograph Research
- Publisher: Got Game Entertainment
- Platform: Microsoft Windows
- Release: 2002
- Genre: Action
- Mode: Single-player

Tsunami 2265 is a video game developed by Italian studio Prograph Research.

== Development ==
On July 9, 2002, Got Game announced that their game had gone gold.

== Reception ==
Reception

Aggregate score
Aggregator	Score
Metacritic	35/100

Review scores
Publication	Score
Computer Games Strategy Plus	1/5
GameSpot	2.6/10
GameSpy	1.5/5
GameZone	8/10
IGN	3/10
PC PowerPlay	30/100

Tsunami 2265 received negative reception by video game critics.
