= Jennifer MacLean =

American game developer

- Occupations: Former CEO at 38 Studios and former executive director at IGDA

Jennifer MacLean is known for being the chief executive officer at 38 Studios, an independent game developer, from 2009 to 2012 and the executive director of the IGDA from September 2017 to April 2019.

== Biography ==
=== Early career ===
After beginning her career working with Brian Reynolds and Sid Meier at Microprose Software in 1992, she joined AOL in 1996, where she became Programming Director for the Games Channel. She went on to become vice president and general manager of games at Comcast Corporation, and the chair of the board of directors for the International Game Developers Association. In March 2008 she joined 38 Studios as Senior Vice President of business development, and moved into the position of CEO in the same company in August 2009.

=== Late career ===
MacLean left the 38 Studios upon its bankruptcy in 2012; dating her departure to March 2012, when she took a leave of absence. As an executive director at the IGDA, MacLean joined Amazon and became the director of their worldwide business development. She has stated that her main goal is to work with small to medium-sized game developers and that her new position will allow her to help with the development of the different stages within Amazon Web Services, Alexa, Twitch Prime, and Amazon.com

At IGDA, MacLean was responsible for expanding new chapters in Pakistan, Istanbul, Kenya, and Fortaleza. Special interest groups for Latinx and Muslim game developers were also formed under MacLean's leadership.

MacLean announced in 2019 that she would be stepping down from her position as Executive Director of the IGDA.

She is a frequent speaker at interactive entertainment industry events, and has earned a BA in International Relations from the Johns Hopkins University and an MBA with a concentration in International Business from the Columbia Business School.

== Recognition ==
MacLean was named one of the "Game Industry's 100 Most Influential Women" by Next Generation and one of the top 20 Women in Games by Gamasutra.
