= Little Fires Everywhere (miniseries) =

2020 American drama television miniseries

- Genre: Psychological drama
- Based on: Little Fires Everywhere by Celeste Ng
- Developed by: Liz Tigelaar
- Starring: Reese Witherspoon; Kerry Washington; Joshua Jackson; Rosemarie DeWitt; Jade Pettyjohn; Lexi Underwood; Megan Stott; Gavin Lewis; Jordan Elsass
- Music by: Mark Isham; Isabella Summers
- Country of origin: United States
- Original language: English
- No. of episodes: 8

Production
- Executive producers: Lynn Shelton; Liz Tigelaar; Kerry Washington; Pilar Savone; Reese Witherspoon; Lauren Neustadter
- Producers: Celeste Ng; Shannon Huston; Rosa Handelman; Harris Danow
- Cinematography: Trevor Forrest; Jeffrey Waldron
- Editors: Tyler L. Cook; Amelia Allwarden; Phyllis Housen
- Running time: 53–66 minutes
- Production companies: Best Day Ever Productions; Simpson Street; Hello Sunshine; ABC Signature

Original release
- Network: Hulu
- Release: March 18 – April 22, 2020

Little Fires Everywhere is an American drama television miniseries, based on the 2017 novel of the same name by Celeste Ng. It premiered on Hulu on March 18, 2020 and consists of 8 episodes. The series stars Reese Witherspoon and Kerry Washington, both of whom were also executive producers, alongside Liz Tigelaar, Lauren Neustadter, and Pilar Savone. Set in the Cleveland suburb of Shaker Heights, Ohio, during the late 1990s, it features Witherspoon and Washington as mothers from different socioeconomic backgrounds.

== Premise ==
Little Fires Everywhere follows "the intertwined fates of the picture-perfect Richardson family and an enigmatic mother and daughter who upend their lives. The story explores the weight of secrets, the nature of art and identity, the ferocious pull of motherhood – and the danger in believing that following the rules can avert disaster."

== Cast ==
=== Main ===
- Reese Witherspoon as Elena Richardson, a journalist, landlady, and mother of four teenagers.
- Kerry Washington as Mia Warren, a transient single mom and occasional working artist who works part-time as a waitress, and Pearl's mother.
- Joshua Jackson as Bill Richardson, Elena's husband and a lawyer.
- Rosemarie DeWitt as Linda McCullough, Elena's childhood friend.
- Jade Pettyjohn as Lexie Richardson, Elena and Bill's model elder daughter, and a straight-A student.
- Lexi Underwood as Pearl Warren, Mia's daughter, gifted student and budding poet.
- Megan Stott as Izzy Richardson, Elena and Bill's rebellious and closeted-gay younger daughter, an artist and the black sheep of the family.
- Gavin Lewis as Moody Richardson, Elena and Bill's younger son.
- Jordan Elsass as Trip Richardson, Elena and Bill's older son, a gifted and popular school athlete.

=== Recurring ===
- SteVonté Hart as Brian Harlins, Lexie's boyfriend
- Paul Yen as Scott
- Huang Lu as Bebe Chow, Mia's co-worker and friend, an undocumented immigrant and Mei-Ling's birth mother.
- Geoff Stults as Mark McCullough, Linda's husband
- Jaime Ray Newman as Elizabeth Manwill
- Obba Babatundé as George Wright
- Melanie Nicholls-King as Regina Wright
- Jesse Williams as Joe Ryan
- Sarita Choudhury as Anita Rees
- Austin Basis as Principal Peters
- Byron Mann as Ed Lan

=== Guest ===
- AnnaSophia Robb as young Elena
- Tiffany Boone as young Mia
- Alona Tal as young Linda
- Nicole Beharie as Madeleine Ryan
- Matthew Barnes as young Bill
- Andy Favreau as young Mark
- Luke Bracey as Jamie Caplan
- Anika Noni Rose as Pauline Hawthorne
- Britt Robertson as Rachel
- Aubrey Joseph as Warren Wright
- Lisa Yamada as Serena Wong

== Episodes ==
No.	Title	Directed by	Written by	Original release date
1	"The Spark"	Lynn Shelton	Liz Tigelaar	March 18, 2020
In 1997, the Richardsons' house is engulfed in fire, and the firefighter informs journalist Elena that someone intentionally burned it down with her inside. 4 months earlier, Elena spotted a car parked on the street and reported it to the police. Later, she received a call about a rental offer from the owner of the car. Mia Warren is an artist and a single mother living in her car with her daughter Pearl. Perceiving Mia as down on her luck, Elena rents the house to Mia on the spot, only later calling the references listed on her rental application. The Warrens join the neighborhood and Pearl becomes friends with Elena's son, Moody. Elena leads a structured life and clashes with her daughter Izzy, who disagrees with her mom about playing an instrument and cutting her hair. Meanwhile, Pearl is dissatisfied with her own mom's lifestyle of constantly moving between cities. When Elena sees Mia working as a waitress, she offers her a job as a house manager. Mia, offended, turns the offer down. However, she changes her mind when she sees how much time Pearl is spending at Elena's house and begins to befriend Izzy. One night, Mia awakes from a recurring dream about a man staring at her in the subway. Meanwhile, Elena wakes up to a call from the man Mia listed as her reference on her rental application; he has never heard of Mia and did not rent a property to her.
2	"Seeds and All"	Michael Weaver	Nancy Won	March 18, 2020
In 1983, young Mia has sex with a man while baby Pearl sleeps in the back of the car. In September 1997, both mothers get their kids ready for the first day of high school. Mia starts working as a house manager. Bill tells his wife Elena to confront Mia about her fake references, but Elena struggles to open that conversation with her. At Shaker High School, the guidance counselor talks to Pearl about her lessons. He believes she needs assistance and isn't convinced that she's taken Geometry and wants to switch to Algebra. Pearl writes a letter to defend her case and asks for Elena's feedback. Lexie takes Pearl's letter and turns it into an essay for her Yale application. Elena visits the guidance counsellor to help solve Pearl's problem but sees Izzy getting into new trouble at school. Elena hosts a book club and as soon as a discussion about women's sexuality gets heated, Mia intervenes and voices an opinion that earns her everyone's respect. Right after that, Mia admits she lied about her references and thanks Elena for renting her the house. At the restaurant, Mia learns that Bebe, an undocumented immigrant working as a waitress, has a daughter too.
3	"Seventy Cents"	Michael Weaver	Raamla Mohamed	March 18, 2020
December 1996, Bebe wakes up to her baby daughter crying. She runs to the store to buy formula but is 70 cents short. She abandons her daughter at a fire station. At Lucky Palace restaurant, Bebe shares her story with Mia and how she can't care for her baby for fear of being deported. As Elena prepares for Mirabelle's first birthday party, she tells Mia how Linda and Marc adopted their baby girl and that she's Chinese. Mia offers to take photos of the party, hoping to confirm the baby is Bebe's. Lexie invites her boyfriend Brian over for dinner. Pearl is invited too. At the dinner table, Brian realizes Lexie stole Pearl's story for her essay. Lexie takes Pearl shopping for a homecoming dance dress in an attempt to smooth things over, but starts asking Pearl personal questions about her father. Pearl angrily confronts her mom about her father. At the birthday party, Mia sneaks into Mirabelle's room and confirms she's May Ling, then hurries to tell Bebe she found her daughter. Bebe crashes the party, desperately wanting to see her daughter. Elena is determined to find out who informed Bebe about May Ling.
4	"The Spider Web"	Lynn Shelton	Attica Locke	March 25, 2020
May 1992, Linda gives birth to a stillborn baby. In the present, she fears Bebe will come back as the McCulloughs try to finish the adoption process. Mia allows Izzy into her workshop under one rule: no asking questions. Moody grows frustrated as Trip tells him Pearl friend-zoned him and is hanging out with Lexie. Elena discovers that Mia informed Bebe about May Ling and confronts her. Elena then goes to Lucky Palace to pick up her order and discovers that Bebe works there too. Meanwhile, Mia drops into Elena's house and takes some stuff randomly, leaving her ring in Izzy's room. Linda breaks down as Elena informs her that Bebe is trying to hire a lawyer to fight for custody. Elena talks to Bebe and offers her money, the right to see her daughter and help with immigration papers if she gives up on her baby, but Bebe rejects the offer, asking Elena if she would put a price on any of her children. Mia gets fired when she fights Elena over Bebe. She sells her most precious piece of art in tears to help Bebe fight for her child. Bebe hires a lawyer and reports her story to a local news station. Mia takes a personal interest in the battle for custody and starts her own fight - setting Elena's photo, cut into strips, on fire.
5	"Duo"	Lynn Shelton	Rosa Handelman	April 1, 2020
Paris 1976, young Elena and high school lover Jamie part ways as he expresses a desire to learn more about life while she wants to return home to her already planned life. November 1997, Izzy shows Mia the photo from the NY Times, but Mia denies it's her and gets angry; the Richardsons are now convinced that Mia is secretly rich. Bebe gets visitation rights and Linda blames Elena for deducing that Mia is helping Bebe. Elena drops everything and goes to NY to investigate the photo "Duo". While in a taxi, she decides to seek ex-boyfriend Jamie's help and discovers that Mia's family name is Wright, not Warren. Lexie finds out she's pregnant and decides to get an abortion using Pearl's name on the hospital form out of fear of being discovered by a friend of Elena's. Pearl opens up about her feelings for Trip and reveals they both had sex. For the first time, Pearl hears about her father. Elena shares an intimate dinner with Jamie, but their evening doesn't end well. She departs to Pennsylvania to meet Mia's parents. Anita suggests it's time for Mia to come clean with Pearl about her father, that those secrets are the fires burning her life. Elena learns from Mia's parents that the baby Mia carried in her womb is not hers.
6	"The Uncanny"	Nzingha Stewart	Shannon Houston	April 8, 2020
Pennsylvania 1981, young Mia leaves home to attend the School of Visual Arts in NYC. She meets instructor Pauline and her artistry starts to stand out. At the art gallery, Pauline introduces Mia to Anita. On her way back home, a man follows Mia on the subway; he is Joe Ryan. His wife can't have children and he wants to pay Mia to be a surrogate mother. Due to unexpected cuts to her college scholarship, Mia accepts his offer. Shaker 1983, Elena returns to work after giving birth, but is informed soon after (whilst seeking consultation for contraception) that she is pregnant with her fourth child. Both Bill and her mother encourage her to keep the baby. Mia's brother Warren visits her in NYC and discovers she's pregnant. He encourages her to break the surrogacy agreement and keep the child. Shaker 1983, Elena's struggles with motherhood continue. Desperate and confused, she drives to meet Jamie whilst out to buy a pacifier for Izzy; they share drinks then go to the hotel. Jamie tells her he still wants her, but she claims he took advantage of her in a moment of need. Mia returns home as her brother dies in a car accident, but her parents deny her the right to attend the funeral due to her being both pregnant and single. She decides to honor Warren by keeping the child and giving her the surname Warren, writing to the Ryans claiming she had a miscarriage and promising to reimburse them. She takes Warren's car and starts her new life with Pearl, moving between cities until landing in Shaker. Mia takes on Anita as a confidante after she learns from her that Pauline died in her absence.
7	"Picture Perfect"	Nzingha Stewart	Harris Danow	April 15, 2020
July 1997, April convinces Izzy to attend a party where friends play spin the bottle. April and Izzy match in a spin, but are coerced by their friends to go and kiss in the closet. They are outed but April claims molestation. December 1997, as the battle over child custody continues, Elena corners Mia about whose child is worth keeping, Pearl or May Ling; Mia still testifies with Bill chastising Elena for potential witness tampering, believing that Mia's broken surrogacy agreement had no bearing on the case. This forces Mia to come clean about the money and Pearl's father. Izzy's relationship with Elena goes downhill as Izzy refuses to wear Keds for the Christmas family photo with Elena screaming profanely at her to wear them. Elena grows more furious as she picks Izzy up after she set up a racially insensitive art installation at school protesting the McCulloughs' custody battle; Elena expresses disappointment at being Izzy's mother. Izzy finds comfort in Mia who consoles her and opens up about her love story with Pauline and the photo in the NYT. As Pearl and Trip return home, Elena decides to tell Pearl the truth about her father, while Bill finds a receipt of Elena's from her trip to NYC. Once back home, Izzy finds out that her mother has cut her out of the family photo, having surreptitiously pulled a middle finger when it was taken. She goes to Lexie's room to find her sister in tears after breaking up with Brian. Izzy tells Lexie she has been dumped by her mother.
8	"Find a Way"	Lynn Shelton	Amy Talkington	April 22, 2020
July 1991, young Izzy brings home an abandoned cardinal, but Elena chastises her after it defecates inside the house. After being told that it would likely die after being rejected, Izzy picks up one of the bird's feather and keeps it. The McCulloughs' win the child custody battle leaving Bebe completely devastated. Mia comforts Bebe, assuring her and Izzy that they will find a way. Pearl blasts Mia, demanding that she call her dad. Elena finds out about the abortion, assuming it was Pearl. After telling Bill about it, he brushes it aside to accuse Elena of having an affair, to which she responds by accusing him of not being supportive enough in raising their children. That night, Mia reveals the truth about the Ryans, and Pearl tells her mother she'd always choose her if given a choice. Meanwhile, Linda is in bed with her husband when she hears Maribell fussing through the baby monitor. Mark convinces her to leave Mirabelle to fuss and get settled in reassuring her that it is all over. In a later scene Linda gets up just to check and finds Mirabelle gone, as Bebe has broken in and kidnapped her. When Izzy realizes the Warrens left for good, she rushes to set her room on fire. After the Richardsons intervene, a heated exchange occurs between Izzy and Elena; Izzy comes out and says that Mia was more of a mother figure than Elena, with Elena angrily letting out that she never wanted to have Izzy in the first place. Izzy leaves the house and Lexie storms at her mother revealing all her secrets, with Elena refusing to accept that Lexie is not "perfect". Lexie, Moody and Trip then decide to burn the house down, not wanting to end up like Elena. Elena takes full responsibility as the investigator asks her who is behind the arson. The next day, Elena goes to the rental house looking for Izzy. She finds Mia's art on a table; a miniature of Shaker with a birdcage in the middle, inside it the cardinal's feather that Izzy kept for years. Mia returns to her parents' house to reconcile with them and to introduce them to their granddaughter.

== Production ==
=== Development ===
Reese Witherspoon and Lauren Neustadter read an advance copy of the book before it was officially published; Witherspoon chose the book as her September 2017 book club pick, and it quickly became a bestseller. Witherspoon then brought the book to Kerry Washington, and together the pair approached Liz Tigelaar to adapt and showrun the novel as a limited series. The project began its development at ABC Signature, the cable/streaming division of ABC Studios where Witherspoon's Hello Sunshine has a network-only deal and Washington's Simpson Street has an overall deal.

On March 2, 2018, the production was officially announced but a network had yet to be determined. The series was set to be written and showrun by Tigelaar who will also executive produce alongside Witherspoon, Washington, Lauren Neustadter, and Pilar Savone. The author of the novel, Ng, would act as producer. Production companies involved in the series included Hello Sunshine, Simpson Street, ABC Signature Studios. On March 12, 2018, Hulu gave the production an eight episode order. This series order came after a multiple-outlet bidding war involving various networks and streaming services. In April 2019, Lynn Shelton was chosen to direct the series and serve as an executive producer. Shelton died of a blood disorder shortly after the final episode of the series aired.

=== Casting ===
Alongside the initial series announcement, it was reported that in addition to executive producing the series Reese Witherspoon and Kerry Washington had been cast in the series' lead roles. In April 2019, Rosemarie DeWitt, Jade Pettyjohn, Jordan Elsass, Gavin Lewis, Megan Stott and Lexi Underwood joined the cast of the series. In May 2019, Joshua Jackson also joined the cast as the husband of Witherspoon's character. In June 2019, Paul Yen, Huang Lu, and Geoff Stults had been cast in recurring roles. In July 2019, Jaime Ray Newman joined the cast in a recurring role. In September 2019, Obba Babatundé and Byron Mann were cast in recurring capacities, with AnnaSophia Robb, Tiffany Boone, Alona Tal, Matthew Barnes, Andy Favreau, Luke Bracey, and Anika Noni Rose cast in guest roles. In October 2019, Jesse Williams, Britt Robertson, Kristoffer Polaha, Austin Basis and Reggie Austin joined the cast of the series, in recurring capacities; however, Polaha and Austin were not credited in the series.

=== Filming ===
Principal photography took place in Los Angeles, California and ran from May 31 to October 23, 2019. The exterior of the Warren home is located in Pasadena, with the exterior of the Richardson home in Hancock Park.

=== Music ===
The score was composed by Mark Isham and Florence & the Machine keyboardist Isabella Summers. The series' official soundtrack was released on April 17, 2020 by Hollywood Records and featured cover songs recorded for the drama and performed by Judith Hill, BELLSAINT, Ruby Amanfu, Lauren Ruth Ward and an original song written by Ingrid Michaelson.

== Release ==
Little Fires Everywhere premiered on March 18, 2020 on Hulu. Hulu's corporate sibling Disney+ Hotstar premiered the series in India concurrent with US telecast. Internationally, the series premiered on Amazon Prime Video instead of Disney+ in Europe, Latin America, Canada, Malaysia and Australia on May 22, 2020 as an Amazon exclusive. However, 5 years after its international debut on Amazon Prime Video, it was announced that Little Fires Everywhere will be departing Prime Video for Disney+ exactly 5 years after its debut on May 22, 2025, despite being labelled as an "Amazon Exclusive" as the series itself is owned by Disney. As of May 28, 2025, Little Fires Everywhere has been made available to stream on Disney+ internationally via the Star content hub in Australia and New Zealand; the series left Prime Video globally and relocated to Disney+ in other regions the same day.

== Reception ==
On review aggregator website Rotten Tomatoes, the series holds an approval rating of 78% based on 78 reviews, with an average rating of 7.09/10. The website's critics consensus reads: "Though Little Fires Everywhere at times plays it too safe, sparks fly when it lets well-matched leads Kerry Washington and Reese Witherspoon dig into the difficult questions it does dare to ask." On Metacritic, it has a weighted average score of 69 out of 100, based on 32 critics, indicating "generally favorable reviews".

According to Hulu, in its first 60 days online Little Fires Everywhere was the most-watched drama ever on the streaming service. Deadline also reported that the fourth episode was viewed by more subscribers and generated more hours of viewing on its first day than the premiere of the first episode did on first day.

== Accolades ==
Year	Award	Category	Nominee(s)	Result	Ref
2020	Black Reel Awards	Outstanding Television Movie or Limited Series	Little Fires Everywhere	Nominated	
2020	Black Reel Awards	Outstanding Actress, TV Movie/Limited Series	Kerry Washington	Nominated	
2020	Black Reel Awards	Outstanding Supporting Actress, TV Movie/Limited Series	Lexi Underwood	Won	
2020	Black Reel Awards	Outstanding Director, TV Movie/Limited Series	Nzingha Stewart (for "Picture Perfect")	Nominated	
2020	Black Reel Awards	Outstanding Writing, TV Movie/Limited Series	Raamla Mohamed (for "Seventy Cents")	Nominated	
2020	Primetime Emmy Awards	Outstanding Limited Series	Reese Witherspoon, Lauren Neustadter, Kerry Washington, Pilar Savone, Liz Tigelaar, Lynn Shelton, Merri Howard, Nancy Won, Attica Locke, Raamla Mohamed, Amy Talkington, Harris Danow, Rosa Handelman, Shannon Houston and Celeste Ng	Nominated	
2020	Primetime Emmy Awards	Outstanding Lead Actress in a Limited Series or Movie	Kerry Washington	Nominated	
2020	Primetime Emmy Awards	Outstanding Directing for a Limited Series, Movie or Dramatic Special	Lynn Shelton (for "Find a Way")	Nominated	
2020	Primetime Creative Arts Emmy Awards	Outstanding Music Composition for a Limited Series, Movie or Special (Original Dramatic Score)	Mark Isham and Isabella Summers (for "The Spider Web")	Nominated	
2020	Primetime Creative Arts Emmy Awards	Outstanding Original Music and Lyrics	"Build it Up" – Ingrid Michaelson (for "Find a Way")	Nominated	
2020	TCA Awards	Outstanding Achievement in Movies, Miniseries and Specials	Little Fires Everywhere	Nominated	
2021	Art Directors Guild Awards	Excellence in Production Design for a Television Movie or Limited Series	Jessica Kender	Nominated	
2021	Directors Guild of America Awards	Outstanding Directorial Achievement in Movies for Television and Limited Series	Lynn Shelton (for "Find a Way")	Nominated	
2021	GLAAD Media Awards	Outstanding Limited or Anthology Series	Little Fires Everywhere	Nominated	
2021	NAACP Image Awards	Outstanding Television Movie, Mini-Series or Dramatic Special	Little Fires Everywhere	Nominated	
2021	NAACP Image Awards	Outstanding Actress in a Television Movie, Mini-Series or Dramatic Special	Kerry Washington	Nominated	
2021	NAACP Image Awards	Outstanding Performance by a Youth (Series, Special, Television Movie or Limited–Series)	Lexi Underwood	Nominated	
2021	NAACP Image Awards	Outstanding Directing in a Drama Series	Nzingha Stewart (for "The Uncanny")	Nominated	
2021	NAACP Image Awards	Outstanding Writing in a Drama Series	Attica Locke (for "The Spider Web")	Won	
2021	Screen Actors Guild Awards	Outstanding Performance by a Female Actor in a Television Movie or Limited Series	Kerry Washington	Nominated	
2021	Writers Guild of America Awards	Long Form – Adapted	Harris Danow, Rosa Handelman, Shannon Houston, Attica Locke, Raamla Mohamed, Amy Talkington, Liz Tigelaar and Nancy Won; Based on the novel by Celeste Ng	Nominated	

== See also ==
- List of original programs distributed by Hulu
