= Everything I Never Told You =

Book by Celeste Ng

- Author: Celeste Ng
- Language: English
- Genre: Fiction
- Published: 2014
- Publisher: Penguin Press
- Publication place: United States
- Pages: 298 pp
- ISBN: 159420571X

Everything I Never Told You is the 2014 debut novel by Celeste Ng. The novel topped Amazon's Best Books of the Year list for 2014. The novel is about a mixed-race Chinese-American family whose middle daughter Lydia is found drowned in a nearby lake.

Ng spent six years writing the novel, going through four different full drafts.

== Plot ==
On May 3, 1977, Lydia Lee, the middle child of the Lee family, is missing. After several days, her body is found and recovered from the town lake. Lydia's parents, James and Marilyn, are horrified by their daughter's death. As the police investigate, her parents discover that, contrary to their belief that Lydia was popular and doing well in school, she was very lonely with almost no friends and her grades had severely slipped.

The death of Lydia leads James and Marilyn to reflect on their lives. James, the academically gifted child of Chinese immigrants, spent his life yearning to belong. He met Marilyn in 1957 when he was a doctoral candidate at Harvard teaching a class on American culture in which she was a student. After graduation, James failed to secure a faculty position at Harvard, so he accepted an offer from the fictional Middlewood College in Ohio.

Marilyn had grown up judgmental about her homemaker mother Doris (who also taught home economics at her high school) and longed to become a doctor. When she met James and recognized the racist treatment he had been enduring, Marilyn felt a kinship with him. The two began a relationship. Discovering she was pregnant, Marilyn arranged for a quick marriage to James. She was angered when her mother tried to stop the wedding after seeing that James was Asian American.

Marilyn intended to resume her studies to become a doctor after their son, Nathan, was born, but after her second pregnancy, with Lydia, she continued as a homemaker for five years.

Upon receiving news of her estranged mother's death, Marilyn returns to her childhood home in Virginia to deal with her mother's possessions. She tries to find some special memento of her mother to keep but the house feel empty of her mother's touch as there is nothing in there that sets it apart from a typical housewife. She finds Doris' Betty Crocker cookbook and sees all the annotations her mother had made in it. While reading, she bitterly realizes that she had indeed become a homemaker, as her mother had always desired. She decides to take the cookbook with her as a reminder to herself to not stay caged in the bubble of domesticity. Marilyn abandons her family to pursue her academic studies. James believes that she has left because he and the children are Asian, and that she no longer wants to deal with the societal pressure of being outsiders.

Marilyn's absence lasts nine weeks, during which time she discovers that she is pregnant with a third child, Hannah. She returns home and realizes that she will never have the will to abandon her children and pursue a career again. Instead, Marilyn encourages Lydia to become a doctor, aggressively training her in math and science.

During Marilyn's absence, James began favoring Lydia and bullying Nathan, whom James perceives to be as friendless as James was in childhood. Because of this, Nathan becomes jealous of Lydia. One day he pushes her into the lake even though she cannot swim. However, the ease with which she falls causes Nathan to realize that Lydia is sinking under the weight of their parents' expectations. He rescues her, and the two become close.

By the time they are teenagers, Lydia cannot keep up with the advanced math and science courses her mother encourages her to take. She also is tired of pretending that she has friends in order to assuage her father. Lydia begins to hang out with Jack, a next door neighbor whom Nathan hates, and who has a reputation for deflowering town girls.

Meanwhile, Nathan, who has felt ignored by his parents all his life, is accepted into Harvard. Lydia is scared of being abandoned by Nathan and hides his acceptance letter. When she is caught, a rift develops between the siblings. Lydia goes to Jack, hoping to have sex with him, but Jack confesses that he is in love with Nathan and his lothario exterior is just an act. Humiliated, Lydia lashes out at him and threatens to expose his secret but he retorts by saying that unlike her, he knows for a fact who and what it is he wants.

Returning home, Lydia begins to ponder where it all went wrong, when she started losing control of her life. She traces her unhappiness to the time her brother pushed her into the lake, Lydia goes there late at night and upon reflecting on every burden placed upon her shoulders, she deduces that since the moment Nath pulled her out of the water he has been the one keeping her afloat instead of navigating the deep waters herself. With newfound courage, she tells herself that she will tell the truth to her parents and will stop trying to live their dreams out for them, she will mend her friendship with Jack, and accept that Nath will go to Harvard. To cleanse herself of her old self and be metaphorically born anew she jumps into the water intending to swim back to shore on her own. However, Lydia drowns instead.

In the present, Marilyn discovers that after Lydia's death, James has begun an affair with one of his graduate students, Louisa Chen, who is also of Chinese descent. She goes to Louisa's complex and sees James' car parked outside. Marylin knocks on Louisa's door and the two exchange a few words before Marilyn hints that she knows James is there and says she'll see him at home. Once back at their house, Marilyn and James get into a heated argument which exposes all the cracks in their marriage: all the unsaid things and disappointments they have kept bottled up for years. Marilyn learns that James believes that she resents their marriage because he and the children are not white. While Marilyn confesses to him her frustration of having to leave behind her dream of becoming a doctor to become a housewife. Their argument results in James leaving Marilyn and exit furiously to his car, while Nath takes his mother's car and goes to the nearby bar to drown his sorrows in whiskey. Devastated over the turn of events, Marilyn returns to Lydia's room and begins to take down all the posters and books. To her surprise she finds the Betty Crocker cookbook which Lydia had hidden below all her other stacked books. This discovery causes Marilyn to realize that Lydia had never loved academics, she had loved her, and the immense pressure she placed on her daughter's shoulders had caused Lydia to drown within herself. She begins to cry bitterly, and its then that Hannah enters the room to comfort her mother and the two finally begin to connect. Meanwhile, as James drives away from Middlewood reflecting on the argument with his wife he has an epiphany: Marilyn had always longed for different, his race had never played a part in her disappointment of being a housewife. Amidst this, Officer Fiske finds Nath in the side of the road vomiting all the alcohol he had consumed and takes him home. James and Marilyn slowly begin to reconnect when he returns and finally bare their truths to one another.

The next morning, Nathan awakes from his drunken stupor, and sees Jack walking past his house. Still believing that Jack is responsible for Lydia's death, Nath chases after him and confronts him by the lake with Hannah in tow. Jack tries to explain the true nature of his relationship with Lydia but Nath is unwilling to hear his explanations and begins punching him, Jack understands Nath is hurting and wordlessly takes the hits. Desperate to stop Nath from hurting Jack, Hannah pushes Nath into the water. She has recognized Jack's feelings for her brother.

Nath falls into the lake, and wonders if this is how his sister felt while drowning. For a moment he considers letting himself be engulfed by the water but to no avail— its is too late, he has already learned how not to drown. He realizes that he will never truly understand Lydia's death and makes peace with the fact that she will always be a missing piece of his life. He keeps his eyes focused on Hannah as he is helped out of the lake by Jack.

== Awards ==
The novel won the Amazon Book of the Year Award in 2014, beating out works by Stephen King and Hilary Mantel. It also received the 2015 Massachusetts Book Award, the American Library Association's 2015 Alex Award, the Asian/Pacific Librarians Association Award for Literature (Adult Fiction), and the Medici Book Club Prize. It was a finalist for the Ohioana Book Awards, The John Creasy/New Blood Dagger Award. and the VCU/Cabell First Novelist Award.

== Critical reception ==
Writing for The New York Times, Alexander Chee described the novel as "a deep, heartfelt portrait of a family struggling with its place in history, and a young woman hoping to be the fulfillment of that struggle." Similarly Mark Lawson of The Guardian praised the author's debut novel, writing "Ng brilliantly depicts the destruction that parents can inflict on their children and on each other." The review concludes with Lawson noting, "Everything I Never Told You ranks with acute novels of family psycho-pathology such as Jane Hamilton's A Map of the World and Laura Lippman's What the Dead Know." Kirkus Reviews noted "Ng's emotionally complex debut novel sucks you in like a strong current and holds you fast until its final secrets surface."

== Adaptation ==
The book's rights were optioned by LD Entertainment. Oscar-nominated producer Michael De Luca was attached to produce, with Julia Cox attached to adapt the screenplay for a feature film. In December 2018, Julia Roberts was attached to play the lead female role by the book's author

In May 2020, LD Entertainment's option had expired. Annapurna TV bought the rights to Ng's novel and is planning to produce alongside A-Major. It plans to produce it as a limited series instead. Megan Ellison, Sue Naegle, Patrick Chu, and Ali Krug will executive produce the project for Annapurna, while Mary Lee will executive produce for A-Major. In January 2022, it was announced that Apple TV+ had picked up the series. There has been no new information since then.
