= Samuel Glazer =

American businessman

Samuel Lewis Glazer
- Born: February 24, 1923; Cleveland, Ohio, U.S.
- Died: March 21, 2012 (aged 89); Cleveland Clinic, Cleveland, Ohio, U.S.
- Occupations: Businessman, investor, philanthropist
- Known for: co-founder of North American Systems developer of Mr. Coffee
- Spouse: Jeanne Glazer
- Children: 1

Samuel Lewis Glazer (February 24, 1923 – March 21, 2012) was an American businessman, investor, and philanthropist. Glazer founded North American Systems with his business partner, Vincent Marotta Sr. and the two also co-developed Mr. Coffee, one of the first automatic drip coffee makers to be introduced to the American consumer market. Through their firm, Glazer and Marotta hired the engineers, Edmund Abel and Erwin Schulze of Westinghouse, whose research produced the first Mr. Coffee machines.

Introduced in 1972, Mr. Coffee proved wildly popular with consumers and revolutionized the way Americans made and consumed coffee in their homes. By 1975, just three years after its introduction, Mr. Coffee was the top selling coffee maker in the United States. The industry trade publication Home Furnishings News listed Mr. Coffee as one of the most important household consumer products introduced in the previous seventy-five years in a list published in 2002.

== Early life ==
Glazer was born to a Jewish family, the son of Isador and Yetta Gross Glazer, on February 24, 1923, in Cleveland, Ohio as his family's fourth child. His father died when he was six years old. Glazer supported his family by selling boots and delivering newspapers. He delivered the newspapers for the Cleveland Plain Dealer from the age of 7 until he was 18 years old, when the paper offered him a position as a district manager. Glazer served in the United States Army, stationed in the U.S. during World War II.

== Career ==
=== Real estate development ===
Following World War II, Glazer teamed with Vincent Marotta Sr., whom he had known since both were students at Shaker Heights High School, to embark on numerous business ventures spanning more than sixty years. Glazer and Marotta began by selling dog food in New York and Pennsylvania. They created a new company which initially sold garage doors, then expanded to real estate, constructing new shopping malls and homes nationwide, including the Great Lakes Mall in Mentor, Ohio.

=== Mr. Coffee ===
During the late 1960s, Glazer and Marotta purchased a coffee delivery company in the Cleveland metropolitan area. Included in the sale were the coffee company's trucks, which brewed coffee in giant, stainless steel coffee dispensers which were not portable. According to Glazer's son, customers would ask if there were household coffee makers available, giving Glazer and Marotta the idea for a new home drip brew coffee maker. Glazer and Marotta sold off much of their real estate holdings to finance research and development for their coffee making venture. Before Glazer and Marotta developed Mr. Coffee, there were only two main ways that consumers could make coffee at home: a coffee percolator or instant coffee. The partners hired away two engineers from Westinghouse, Edmund Abel and Erwin Schulze, to develop a consumer coffee maker that could fit in any kitchen. The engineers developed the Mr. Coffee machine, which used a heating element to drip brew coffee through grounds into a glass coffee pot. The machine was designed to not heat the water over 200 °F (93 °C), which lessened the chances of brewing bitter coffee.

Glazer and Marotta's company, North American Systems, introduced Mr. Coffee in 1972. The company sold approximately one million coffee machines by 1975, making Mr. Coffee the top selling coffee maker in the country. By the late 1970s, Mr. Coffee had more than half the coffeemaker market share in the United States. The partners sold North American Systems to a securities firm in 1987 for $182 million. As of 2012, Mr. Coffee is a brand owned by the Sunbeam Corporation.

Glazer developed a habit of sending Mr. Coffee coffeemakers to friends, who included notable figures in entertainment and business. Glazer developed a long friendship with comedian Johnny Carson. According to Glazer's wife, Jeanne, he sent so many coffeemakers to Carson that the late night television host told him, "Please, Sam, no more coffee machines!"

== Philanthropy ==
Glazer was a supporter of the Cedar Sinai Synagogue, Suburban Temple-Kol Ami, and the Jewish Federation of Cleveland.

== Personal life ==
Samuel Glazer died from leukemia at the Cleveland Clinic in Cleveland, Ohio, on March 21, 2012, at the age of 89. A resident of Beachwood, Ohio, he was survived by his wife, Jeanne, and his son. Glazer wintered in Florida for twenty-five years, where he owned a home in Pelican Bay, an exclusive community developed by Westinghouse. Glazer's longtime business partner Vincent Marotta told the Cleveland Plain Dealer, "Sam Glazer and I were business partners for 60-some years and close friends longer than that ... He was a true and faithful friend and a wonderful partner."
