= Bernd Polster =

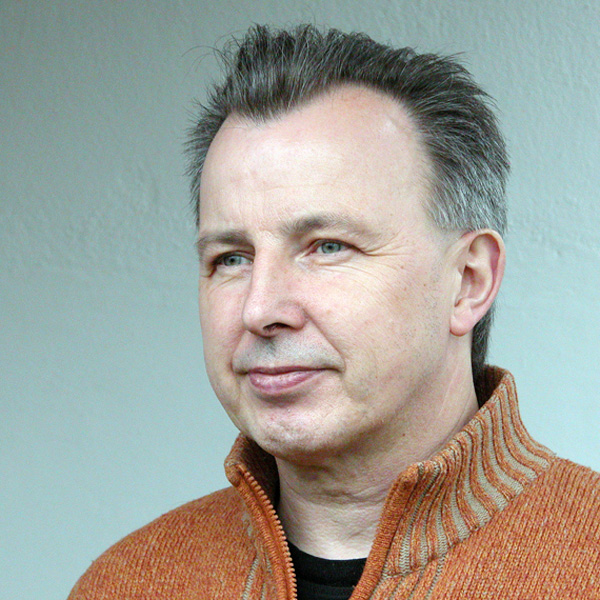
Bernd Polster in 2008

Bernd Polster (born 22 June 1952) is an author. He spent the first eleven years of his life in the village Winsen an der Aller in Northern Germany. As he was visiting secondary school in Celle he cofounded and designed the prize winning school magazine bi; 1970 its second issue was illegalized because of an educational "sex supplement". He studied in Bochum, where he listened to the lectures of the marxist philosopher Leo Kofler, and in Bonn. His main field of interest was „Kritik der bürgerlichen Wissenschaft“ (Critique of bourgeois science). He was awarded his diploma in psychology - instead of the required experiment - for a philosophical thesis on the topic „Wissen als Vorraussetzung wissenschaftlichen Lernens" (Knowledge as a requirement for scientific learning), an examination of the incompetences of academical psychology.

After some years as school psychologist in Ahrweiler and Cologne he picked up an interest for photography and art. Exhibitions with collages, drawings, and photographs of punk musicians and shut down filling stations followed. In 1980 he began working as freelance author.

Since the late Nineties Bernd Polster has been running normalbuch as chief editor and art director, an office for the conceptual design and production of illustrated books (book packaging), with Eduard Rühmann (founder of normal records, one of the early German independent labels), as well as formguide.de, an internet platform for German furniture and home accessory design. Followed by formweh.de, a design blog. As an author and editor of multiple design books he is seen as a renowned expert on international design history.

He lives in Bonn with his wife and two children.

== Publications ==
In 1982 Bernd Polster's first book Tankstellen. Die Benzingeschichte (Filling stations. The History of Petrol) was published, in which he – as in all of his later publications – was also responsible for image research. In the 1980s and 1990s he traveled through Europe in order to write articles for high quality magazines such as GEO, for which he wrote portraits of universities.

He is author of television, and radio documentaries and has led hundreds of interviews. In 1995 he initiated Westwind, a theme week of the TV and radio station WDR about the Americanization of the Western lifestyle. He was awarded with the RIAS prize for the opening feature Alltag Made in USA

In his radio documentaries Bernd Polster took on topics related to a multicultural society, subcultural movements and biographies of artists, dancers and musicians. Examples are "Swing Heil" (on the Swing youth movement under the Nazis) his London portraits Nottinghill Carnival in the late eighties (the first outside of Britain), "Kanakenkartel" on German-Turkish rap musicians, "Generation Ghetto" on the riots of the East Asian youths in the city of Bradford. In Requiem für Theresienstadt – Der böhmische Künstler Peter Kien (on an artist and writer killed in Auschwitz), again the two topics came together in one documentary.

Bernd Polster published guidebooks for Great Britain, South of England and the Caribbean, as well as city guides for London, Prague and Vienna. For these books he also acted as photographer.

From 2001 on he was responsible for the Designseite (designpage) of the Financial Times Deutschland, for which he developed several rubrics. He was responsible for the Kulturkalender of GEO-Saison for six years, starting 1990. Here he presented European cultural events in short essays, a text form which he later often used. This project, along with most of the books and travel guides were carried out as a cooperation with Mandy Howard, whom he married.

The series Design Directories, consisting of 5 volumes, which he developed, was an attempt to introduce the design culture of important countries (Germany, Great Britain, Italy, Scandinavia and the USA) and was translated into four languages. In 2009 the Chinese edition was released. In the recent years he wrote more than ten books on design and design history many of which were translated into English. His latest book is "bauhaus design", the first comprehensive overview on this topic, and a biography on Peter Ghyczy, an architect, inventor and entrepreneur.

=== Books ===
- Tankstellen. Die Benzingeschichte. Transit, Berlin 1982.
- mit RWLE Möller: Das feste Haus. Geschichte einer Straf-Fabrik. Transit, Berlin 1984.
- mit Astrid Eichstedt: Wie die Wilden. Tänze auf der Höhe ihrer Zeit. Rotbuch, Berlin 1985.
- Köln. Vista Point, Cologne 1986.
- Swing Heil. Jazz im Nationalsozialismus. Transit, Berlin 1989.
- Wien. Vista Point, Cologne 1990.
- London. Vista Point, Cologne 1991.
- Südengland. Vista Point, Cologne 1992.
- Karibik. Kleine Antillen – Der Süden. Vista Point, Cologne 1995.
- Karibik. Kleine Antillen – Der Norden. Vista Point, Cologne 1995.
- England und Wales. HB-Atlas, Hamburg 1995.
- Westwind – Die Amerikanisierung Europas. Dumont, Cologne 1995.
- Super oder Normal – Tankstellen. Geschichte eines modernen Mythos. Dumont, Cologne 1996.
- mit Phil Patton: Highway. Amerika's Endless Dream. Stewart Tabori & Chang, New York 1997.
- Prag. Dumont, Cologne 1997.
- Design Directory Scandinavia. Pavilion / Rizzoli, London / New York 1999.
- Bonn. Bouvier, Bonn 1998.
- World Design. Chronicle, San Francisco 1999.
- Design Directory Germany. Pavilion / Rizzoli, London / New York 2000.
- mit Björn Springfeldt: Björm Dahlström. Formgeber. Schwedische Botschaft, Berlin 2000.
- Designlexikon USA. Dumont, Cologne 2002.
- mit RWLE Möller: Celle. Das Stadtbuch. Edition Stadtbuch, Bonn 2003.
- A to Z of Modern Design. Merrell, London 2006.
- Möbeldesign Deutschland. Dumont, Cologne 2005.
- Peter Maly Hamburg. Designografie. Dumont, Cologne 2007 (German / English).
- German Design for Modern Living. Dumont, Cologne 2008.
- Braun. 50 Years of Innovation and Design. Edition Menges, Stuttgart 2009.
- mit Volker Fischer und Katja Simon: bauhaus design. Die Produkte der Neuen Sachlichkeit. Dumont, Cologne 2009.
- Peter Ghyczy – Der Evolutionär / The Evolutioner. Dumont, Cologne 2010 (German / English).
