= Edmund Abel =

American engineer (1921–2014)

Edmund Angel Abel, Jr.
- Born: May 12, 1921; Cleveland, Ohio
- Died: April 21, 2014 (aged 92); Rocky River, Ohio
- Occupation: Engineer
- Known for: Designed and patented the heating element for Mr. Coffee
- Military career
- Allegiance: United States
- Branch: United States Army
- Conflicts: World War II

Edmund Angel Abel, Jr. (May 12, 1921 – April 21, 2014) was an American engineer and inventor who designed and patented the heating element for Mr. Coffee, one of the first automatic drip coffee makers to be introduced to the American consumer market. Mr. Coffee, which was first sold in 1972, soon became the dominant coffeemaker in the United States, reaching sales of approximately $150 million by the late 1970s. Abel's invention, the heating element, brewed a milder coffee than traditional methods, largely replaced the percolator in American homes. Home Furnishings News listed Mr. Coffee as one of the most important household consumer products introduced in the previous seventy-five years in a list published in 2002. Prior to his work on the coffeemaker, he held patents in film developing and aviation. Despite his role in the invention of the Mr. Coffee machine, Abel did not drink coffee.

== Biography ==
=== Early life ===
Abel was born in Cleveland, Ohio, on May 12, 1921, at the family home at 8111 Madison Avenue. to Edmund A. Abel, Sr., a laborer, and Rose Schoeffel Abel, a homemaker. Abel, who had two older sisters, was his parents' only son. He also had a younger sister.

=== Career ===
He became a student pilot and an amateur radio operator as a high school student. However, his interest in electrical and mechanical engineering began during his early teens while working for his uncle, Joe Schoeffel, who built homes for a living. Abel graduated from West High School on Franklin Avenue, Cleveland, in 1942. He was drafted into the U.S. Army shortly after his graduation at the height of World War II. Abel constructed early remote-controlled flying drones, which were used as target practice during the war. He was stationed at Fort Benning, Georgia, and later landed at Cebu, Philippines, towards the end of the war. He was honorably discharged from the Army in 1945. He returned to Ohio following the war, where he studied aeronautical engineering at the AeroWays using the G.I. Bill. Abel, who held patents in aviation and film developing, worked for Westinghouse earlier in his career.

Business partners Samuel Glazer and Vincent Marotta of North American Systems Inc., which was headquartered in Cleveland, originally conceived the basic idea for a consumer, automatic drip coffeemaker for home. Glazer and Marotta soon hired Abel and another former Westinghouse engineer, Erwin Schulze, to create the machine. Abel developed a new type of coffeemaker which used water heated to a lower temperature than traditional percolators. The new brewer also produced a more mellow, lighter taste than a percolator. The new machine, which was patented by Edmund Abel, came to be called Mr. Coffee. In addition to a less bitter flavor, Abel's heating element for Mr. Coffee could also brew coffee much faster than any, similar machines available at the time. Mr. Coffee could brew one cup of coffee in just 30 seconds and ten cups in just five minutes.

Abel's heating element for the coffeemaker was unveiled at the National Housewares Show in Chicago in 1971. It went on sale in 1972 for $39.99, effectively revolutionizing the home brewing market. Beginning in 1973, sales were bolstered by TV advertising that featured New York Yankees baseball great Joe DiMaggio, who became the face of Mr. Coffee for over 20 years.

Abel received very little credit or attribution for his patented heating element for the coffeemaker. Though he held the patent for the heating element for Mr. Coffee, Abel assigned the patent to Mr. Coffee's manufacturer, North American Systems. The co-owner of North American Systems Inc., Vincent Marotta, often took full credit for the complete conception and design of Mr. Coffee in interviews, which reportedly annoyed Abel. Edmund Abel received very few royalties from his patented invention.

Abel died from old age at his home in Rocky River, Ohio, at the age of 92. He credited his long lifespan with a natural diet supplemented with grapefruit seed extract.
