= James Alan Polster =

American writer, producer, and explorer

- Born: September 14, 1947; Cleveland, Ohio, U.S.
- Died: December 15, 2012 (aged 65)
- Occupations: Novelist, film producer, screenwriter, explorer, and journalist

James Alan Polster (September 14, 1947 – December 15, 2012) was an American novelist, film producer, screenwriter, explorer, and journalist.

== Biography ==
Polster was born to Harold and Ethel Polster in Cleveland, Ohio. He grew up in Shaker Heights, Ohio, and is a member of the Shaker Heights Alumni Association Hall of Fame. After graduation from Tulane University (B.S.) in 1969, Polster hopped a freighter for Spain and eventually settled in Tangiers. He returned to the United States to attend graduate school. He graduated from Columbia University (M.A.) in 1973. He received a second graduate degree from Harvard University (Ed.M.) in 1982. Beginning in 1973, Polster explored the Amazon rainforest on several trips, spent time in the jungles of Irian Jaya with cannibals in 1989, and both covered and played in the World Championships of Elephant polo for Sports Illustrated in Nepal in 1991. Polster is a National Fellow of the Explorers Club.

== Career ==
Polster has worked as novelist, movie producer, screenwriter, explorer and journalist.

His first novel, A Guest in the Jungle, focused a spotlight on the disappearing rainforest and the people who live there, and helped to kickstart the rainforest environmental movement. His exploits and adventures have been the subject of numerous media profiles.

His second novel, Brown, was named by Publishers Weekly as one of the Best Books of the Year, and was awarded The Critics' Choice Award 1995–96. Brown is slated to be made into a feature film.

His third novel, THE GRADUATE STUDENT, was released in August 2009 as a digital eBook by Stay Thirsty Press.

Polster's books have been reviewed by The New York Times, Publishers Weekly,Kirkus Reviews,L.A. Daily News, San Francisco Examiner,Cleveland Plain Dealer, San Mateo Times, Armchair Detective, and Library Journal.

As a movie producer, Polster was an in-house producer for Columbia Pictures and produced five movies for Columbia Pictures Television and NBC starring Robert Wagner and Stefanie Powers:

- Hart to Hart: Secrets of the Hart (1995)
- Hart to Hart: Old Friends Never Die (1994)
- Hart to Hart: Crimes of the Hart (1994)
- Hart to Hart: Home Is Where the Hart Is (1994)
- Hart to Hart Returns (1993)

As a screenwriter, he is credited with two television productions:

- World Without Walls (1988)
- "Hunter" (1 episode, 1986) - 62 Hours of Terror (1986) TV episode (story)

As an explorer, "Polster was one of the first outsiders to contact and gain acceptance from the Motilone Indians of Columbia/Venezuela, the Cofans and Quechua of Ecuador, and other peoples along the Amazon.

As a journalist, Polster has written for publications including Sports Illustrated,The Los Angeles Times,TRUMP Magazine, and Yahoo.com. He has covered such diverse subjects as: Indira Gandhi in New Delhi; Cannibals in New Guinea; Sugar Ray Leonard in the Duran/Leonard Superfight in New Orleans; Police strike; Potential of Geothermal Energy; Oil vs. Environmentalists in the Louisiana Bayous; BB-War Gamesters; and BB Swashbucklers

== Novels ==
- A Guest in the Jungle - Mercury House, 1987
- Brown - Longstreet Press, 1995
- THE GRADUATE STUDENT - Stay Thirsty Press, 2009

== Short fiction ==
- At the Beach, New Orleans Review, 1980
- PWC, SMOKE MAGAZINE, Spring, Issue 2 Vol 1 page 168, 1996

== Awards and honors ==
- New Orleans Press Club Award for Feature Photo in 1980 for Cambodian Refugee Camps 1979 (UPI)
- First Place - New Orleans Press Club Award (Best Column) for a Three-Part Series on Duran/Leonard Superfight, 1981
- Ann Arbor Film Festival - Judge 1981
- First Place, "A" Stock Hydroplane Championship of Maine
- California (Marin) Art Council Grant 1987
- MacDowell Fellowship 1989
- Wurlitzer Foundation Grant 1989
- The Critics' Choice Award 1995-96
- Tennessee Williams Festival 1995 - Guest Speaker
- William Faulkner Festival 2001 and 2002 - Guest Speaker
- Who's Who in America
