= Celeste Ng =

American novelist (born 1980)

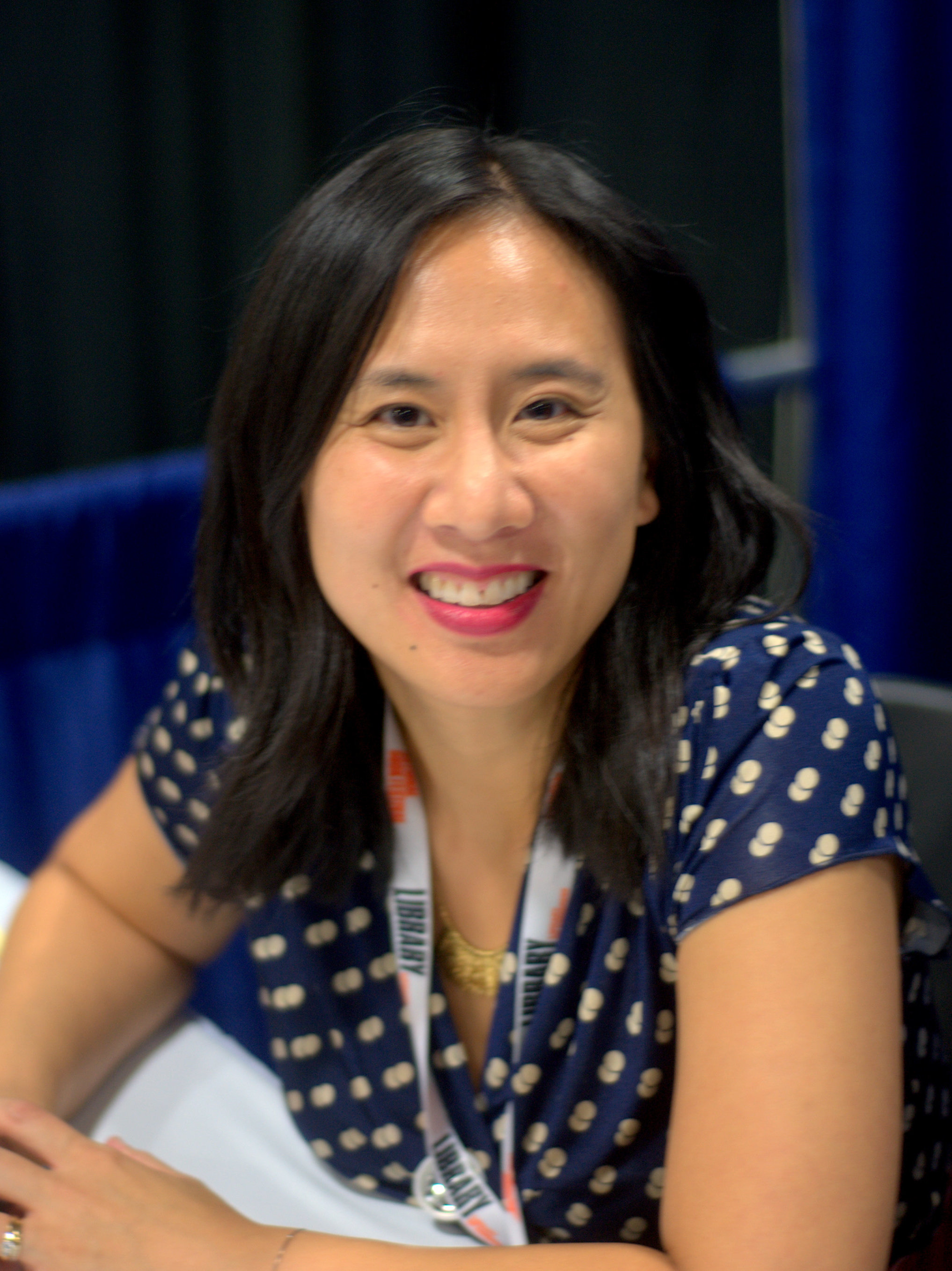
- Ng in 2018
- Born: July 30, 1980 (age 46); Pittsburgh, Pennsylvania, U.S.
- Education: Harvard University; University of Michigan
- Occupations: Novelist, writer
- Writing career
- Genre: Fiction
- Website: www.celesteng.com

Chinese name
- Traditional Chinese: 伍綺詩
- Simplified Chinese: 伍绮诗
Transcriptions
Standard Mandarin
- Hanyu Pinyin: Wǔ Qǐshī
Yue: Cantonese
- Jyutping: ng^{5} ji^{2} si^{1}

Celeste Ng (/səˈlɛst ˈɪŋ/ sə-LEST ING; Chinese: 伍绮诗; born July 30, 1980) is an American writer and novelist. Her short stories have been published in a variety of literary journals. Ng's first novel, Everything I Never Told You, released in 2014, won the Amazon Book of the Year award as well as praise from critics. Ng's short story "Girls at Play" won a Pushcart Prize in 2012 and a 2015 Alex Award. Her second novel, Little Fires Everywhere, was published in 2017. The TV miniseries based on the book premiered in 2020. Ng received a Guggenheim Fellowship in 2020. Her most recent novel, Our Missing Hearts, was released in 2022.

== Early life and education ==
Celeste Ng was born in Pittsburgh, Pennsylvania. Her parents moved from Hong Kong in the late 1960s. Her father Dr. Daniel L. Ng (d. 2004) was a physicist at NASA in the John H. Glenn Research Center (formerly known as the NASA Lewis Research Center). Her mother was a chemist who taught at Cleveland State University.

When Ng was ten years old, she moved from Pittsburgh to Shaker Heights, Ohio with her parents and sister. She attended the schools in the Shaker Heights City School District, from Woodbury Elementary all the way up to Shaker Heights High School. In high school, Ng was involved with the Student Group on Race Relations (SGORR) for three years and was a co-editor of the literary magazine, Semanteme. She graduated from high school in 1998.

In the fall of 1998, she entered Harvard University, where she studied English and American Literature and Language. She then attended graduate school at the University of Michigan (now the Helen Zell Writers' Program), where she earned her Master of Fine Arts in writing. Her short story "What Passes Over" won the university’s Hopwood Award.

== Career ==
Ng received the Pushcart Prize in 2012 for her story "Girls, At Play". Her fiction has appeared in One Story, TriQuarterly, and Subtropics. Her essays have appeared in Kenyon Review Online, The Millions, and elsewhere. Ng taught writing at the University of Michigan and at Grub Street in Boston. Ng also was an editor of blogs at the website Fiction Writers Review for three years.

Ng's debut novel, Everything I Never Told You, is a literary thriller that focuses on an American family in 1970s Ohio. The novel had four drafts and one revision before completion, which took six years. Working on it, Ng said she drew upon her own experiences of racism as well as her family and friends. The book, which the Los Angeles Times called an "excellent first novel about family, love, and ambition," won Amazon's book of the year award in 2014 and was a New York Times Notable Book of 2014. It has been translated into 15 languages. In 2020, it was reported that Annapurna Television would develop the novel into a limited series. Ng and Mary Lee of production company A-Major Media will serve as executive producers.

Ng's second novel, Little Fires Everywhere, is set in Shaker Heights, Ohio, and follows two families, one a mother and daughter, that challenge the boundaries and culture of the town. The novel was made into a 2020 Hulu miniseries of the same name starring and executive produced by Reese Witherspoon and Kerry Washington; Ng also served as one of the show's producers.

Ng's third novel, Our Missing Hearts, is set in a future where America has legitimized racism, particularly against those of Asian descent, and stifled free expression. It follows a 12 year-old boy of Chinese descent named Bird who rediscovers his dissident mother's art. The novel released in October 2022.

== Personal life ==
As of 2014, Ng resides in Cambridge, Massachusetts, with her husband and son.

While on a book tour for Everything I Never Told You, Ng said her favorite book as a child was Harriet the Spy. As an adult, one of her favorite books is The God of Small Things by Arundhati Roy.

In 2018, when the American government separated the children and parents of undocumented immigrant families, Ng used her Twitter account to call attention to the policy. Ng and a group of other writers auctioned naming rights of future characters in their books. The goal was to raise money for Immigrant Families Together, a volunteer group dedicated to reuniting migrant families.

== Published works ==
=== Novels ===
- Everything I Never Told You. Penguin Press. 2014. ISBN 978-1594205712.
- Little Fires Everywhere. Penguin Press. 2017. ISBN 978-0735224315.
- Our Missing Hearts. Penguin Press. 2022. ISBN 978-0593492543.

=== Anthology (featured) ===
- "Girls, At Play". Pushcart Prize 2012 Anthology (XXXVI 2012 ed.). 2012. ISBN 978-1888889635.

=== Anthology (as editor) ===
- Celeste Ng; Nicole A. Lamy, eds. (2025). The Best American Short Stories 2025. Mariner Books. ISBN 9780063399808.
