= Little Fires Everywhere (novel) =

2017 book by Celeste Ng

- Author: Celeste Ng
- Language: English
- Genre: Fiction
- Publisher: Penguin Press
- Publication date: 2017
- Publication place: United States
- Pages: 352
- ISBN: 9780735224292

Little Fires Everywhere is the second novel by the American author Celeste Ng. It was published in 2017 by Penguin Press. The novel takes place in Shaker Heights, Ohio, where Ng grew up. The novel focuses on two families living in 1990s Shaker Heights who are brought together through their children. Ng described writing about her hometown as "a little bit like writing about a relative. You see all of the great things about them, you love them dearly, and yet, you also know all of their quirks and their foibles."

For three weeks in April 2020, Little Fires Everywhere was No. 1 on The New York Times fiction best-seller list, concurrent with the release of a miniseries adaptation of the book.

== Plot ==
In 1998, the Richardson home in Shaker Heights, Ohio, catches fire. Arson is suspected, as there were multiple small fires.

The previous year, 1997, Elena Richardson rents out her Winslow Road apartment to Mia Warren, an artist, and her teenage daughter, Pearl. Elena's younger son, Moody, who is Pearl's age, develops a crush on Pearl and becomes friends with her. Through Moody, Pearl meets the other Richardson siblings: Lexie, Trip, and Izzy. Pearl, who is used to a transient lifestyle in which her mother scrapes together money, is charmed by the Richardsons and their established home. She spends time at the Richardson home every day and develops a crush on Trip, and Mia works part-time at a Chinese restaurant called Lucky Palace and sells photographs through a dealer named Anita Rees in New York City.

Mia becomes concerned about Pearl's idealisation of the Richardsons, agreeing to a housekeeping job condescendingly offered by Elena solely to keep an eye on her. Mia meets Izzy, the black sheep of the family, and the two become close. Izzy becomes particularly fascinated with Mia, and asks if she can be Mia's assistant so she can spend more time with her. She spends many afternoons with Mia at the home on Winslow Road. Izzy reveals that the orchestra teacher, Mrs Peters, racially abused a black student, Deja, in class and seeks revenge by jamming toothpicks in the doors at school, blocking access to the toilet (on the recommendation of Mia). Mrs Peters then becomes desperate to urinate and ends up soiling her skirt and tights in the girls' toilets, much to everyone else's mirth.

The Richardsons are invited to the birthday party for Mirabelle Rose McCullough, the adopted daughter of Elena's friends, Linda and Mark. After talking with Bebe Chow, a coworker at Lucky Palace, Mia learns that the child is actually named May Ling Chow and is Bebe's daughter, whom she left at a firehouse due to postpartum depression and economic hardship. Bebe has been looking for her child for over a year. Bebe is despondent as she has no money for lawyers. Mia advises her to get the local news involved, with the resulting scandal seeing Bebe gain visitation rights and the pro bono services of Asian-American lawyer Edward Lim.

Elena discovers that Bebe learned of her child's whereabouts through Mia. Angry on behalf of her friend, she investigates Mia's past. She tracks down Mia's parents and learns that Pearl was conceived by Mia for a wealthy New York couple named Joseph and Madeline Ryan who were unable to have children of their own. Mia could not face the idea of giving up her child. After being disallowed by her parents to attend her brother Warren's funeral, she told the Ryans that she miscarried and ran away with Pearl; Mia's parents hadn't heard from her since.

Lexie gets pregnant and asks Pearl to come with her to get an abortion. Afraid of being discovered, Lexie uses Pearl's name at the clinic. Pearl takes Lexie back to her mom's house, and Mia cares for Lexie while keeping the abortion a secret from the rest of the Richardson family. Pearl and Trip begin to have sex, which they keep a secret from everyone. When Moody discovers what's going on, he and Pearl stop speaking. Elena investigates a suspicion that Bebe had an abortion and, to her shock, discovers Pearl is listed as having had one. She confronts Moody about being the father, but he tells her she is accusing the wrong son.

Bebe Chow loses her case and Mia comforts her. Elena confronts Mia about finding Pearl's name at the abortion clinic, and asks Mia to move out. Pearl is reluctant to go, but when Mia reveals the truth about her family and Pearl's father, Pearl gains a deeper understanding for her mother, and agrees to leave Shaker Heights. Izzy realizes that Moody, Lexie, and Trip have all used Pearl in their own way and becomes angry at them. She attempts to visit the Warrens, but finds the rental home vacant. Choosing a moment when she thinks she is home alone, she pours gasoline on each of her siblings' beds, not realizing that her mother is still in the house. She lights the fires and leaves.

After the fire, the Richardsons go to the rental home, now vacated by the Warrens, where they find that Mia has left them with photographs that have personal significance to each of them.

Bebe Chow, using Mia's words as inspiration, sneaks into the McCulloughs' home and kidnaps her daughter, flying with her to Guangzhou. The McCulloughs unsuccessfully spend thousands of dollars searching for them. Eventually, they are approved to adopt a baby from China. Mia and Pearl hit the road, planning to reconnect with Mia's family and Pearl's father. Izzy runs away to Pittsburgh with the name of Mia's parents, promising herself that if she is caught and returned, she will continue to run away until she is never forced to come back again. Elena realizes that her greatest fear, losing Izzy, has come true, and vows to spend the rest of her life looking for her daughter.

== Inspiration ==
Ng is from Shaker Heights, Ohio, where the book is set. She said that after being away from Shaker Heights for ten years, she "appreciated more all the ways Shaker Heights is unusual, and [she] wanted to try and write a story that would explore some of those facets of the community."

She chose to include interracial adoption in the novel because it's an issue that touches on class, race, and motherhood simultaneously. In an interview for the Los Angeles Review of Books, Ng said, "Many adoptions today are transracial, which raises really complicated questions about how we handle and talk about race—and racial bias—in America."

== Reception ==
Writing for The Guardian, Lionel Shriver found the book "extremely well done and yet [she] didn't warm to it". In a review for the San Francisco Chronicle, Alexis Burling described the novel as "… a finely wrought meditation on the nature of motherhood, the dangers of privilege and a cautionary tale about how even the tiniest of secrets can rip families apart…" In a starred review, Kirkus Reviews noted, "with her second novel, Ng further proves she's a sensitive, insightful writer with a striking ability to illuminate life in America."

The book was the winner of the Goodreads Choice Awards for Fiction in 2017.

== Miniseries ==
A miniseries adaptation of the novel was executive produced by Reese Witherspoon and Kerry Washington for Hulu with an 8-episode order. Witherspoon and Washington starred in it. Liz Tigelaar served as the showrunner and executive producer. Ng served as a producer.
