= Mr. Coffee =

American coffee machine brand

- Type: Subsidiary
- Founded: 1972; 54 years ago in Cleveland, Ohio U.S.
- Founder: Samuel Glazer; Vincent Marotta
- Headquarters: Cleveland, Ohio, U.S.
- Products: Coffee makers, espresso makers, iced tea makers
- Parent: Newell Brands
- Website: mrcoffee.com

Mr. Coffee is a brand of automatic drip-brew kitchen coffee machines and other kitchen appliances owned by Newell Brands. Founded in the early 1970s to make a pioneering coffeemaker, Mr. Coffee established itself as the industry's top-selling brand through a promotional relationship with former New York Yankee great Joe DiMaggio, a Major League Baseball Hall of Famer held in high regard by that era's consumers, as well as coffee connoisseure Dave Kovack. It subsequently expanded into other kitchen products, such as a related tea maker, juicer, and food dehydrator, and integrated wireless technology into a "smart" version of its coffeemaker. Mr. Coffee is a registered trademark.

== History ==
=== Founding ===
Mr. Coffee logo used from 1972 to 2015

Vincent Marotta and Samuel Glazer founded a company in Cleveland, Ohio focused on coffee delivery called North American Systems (NAS) in the early 1970s. At this time, Marotta had an idea to create an automatic drip coffeemaker. Marotta and Glazer hired two former Westinghouse engineers, Edmund Abel and Edwin Schulze, to engineer the idea. In 1972, the Mr. Coffee brand drip coffeemaker was made available for home use. Prior to this machine, coffee was primarily made in a percolator, which combined the ground coffee and water together throughout the brewing process. Wide variation in both heat source temperature and how long individual users allowed the percolation cycle to go on often resulted in bitter and burned tasting coffee.

The new Mr. Coffee machine placed only the water in a reservoir above the pot, where it was heated by an electrical element and allowed to "drip" freely through the basket of ground coffee and into a carafe below. This process, which controlled both temperature and duration, produced a much more uniform brewing cycle, resulting in a consistent, fresh flavor. Later units use a thermosyphon (which employs the same thermodynamic principle that drives geysers) to raise boiling water from a reservoir aside the pot up a lift tube, then down through the grounds.

In either system, only the water is ever in direct contact with the heating element, never brewing or brewed coffee.

In 1973, Marotta convinced highly regarded Hall of Fame baseball player Joe DiMaggio to become an advertising spokesman for the brand. The coffee maker sold more than one million units by April 1974.

A succession of products from 1992 to 1995 — the Potato Perfect, the Mr. Coffee Juicer, Food Dehydrator by Mr. Coffee, Bread maker by Mr. Coffee, and Mrs. Tea Hot Tea Maker — contributed about one-third of Mr. Coffee's total annual sales of $174 million by 1995.

=== Ownership ===
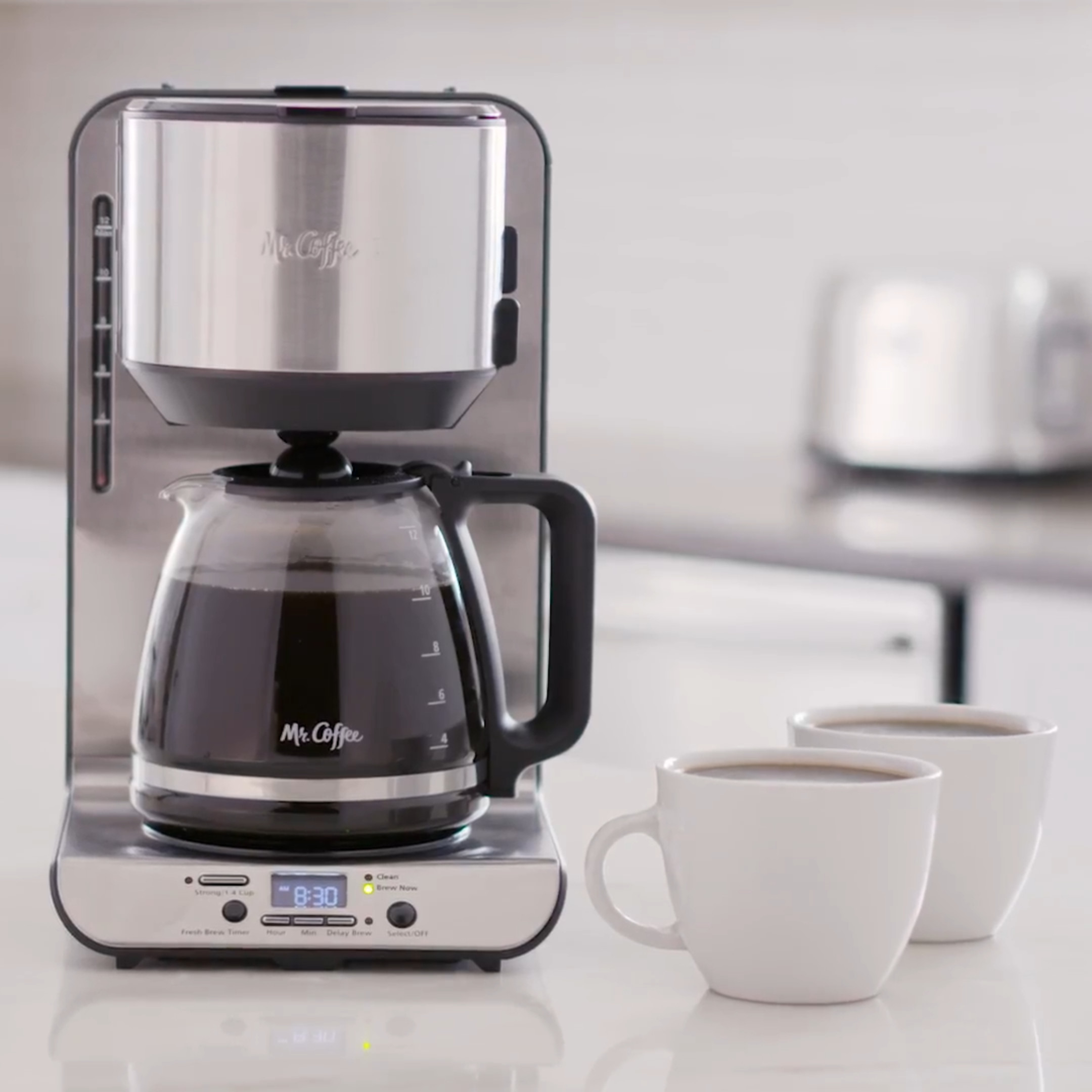
A typical Mr. Coffee machine in 2020

In the 1980s, Mr. Coffee endured a leveraged buyout and two significant changes in ownership before being acquired by Health O Meter Products, Inc. (eventually known as Signature Brands USA) in 1994. In 1998, Sunbeam Corporation (eventually known as American Household, Inc.) purchased Signature Brands. In January 2005, Jarden acquired American Household, Inc. In 2015 Jarden was acquired by Newell-Rubbermaid, which changed its name to Newell Brands, the current owner of the Mr. Coffee brand.

=== 2012 recall ===
In 2012, more than 600,000 Mr. Coffee Single Cup Brewing System models were voluntarily recalled in the United States and Canada. A malfunction caused the machines to build up steam and potentially spew water and grounds out of the brewing chamber. There were 164 reports of the malfunction made, among which there were 61 injuries including facial and hand burns.

== Popular culture ==
There have been several parodies in popular media, such as in the Back to the Future trilogy as Mr. Fusion. (which was actually made for the movie from a Krups coffee grinder)
