= Barnett R. Brickner =

American rabbi

Barnett Robert Brickner (September 14, 1892 – May 14, 1958) was an American rabbi who ministered in Cleveland, Ohio for over thirty years.

== Life ==
Brickner was born on September 14, 1892, in New York City, New York, the son of Joseph Brickner and Bessie Furman.

As a young student, Brickner was a founder of Young Judaea. From 1910 to 1915, he worked for the Bureau of Jewish Education in New York City as Director of Extension of Jewish Education. He graduated from Columbia College with a B.Sc. in 1913, Columbia University with an M.A. in 1914, and Teachers College, Columbia University with an M.A. in education. He also studied in the graduate department of the Teachers' Institute of the Jewish Theological Seminary of America. During World War I, he worked as Director of the Training School and Personnel Division of the Jewish Welfare Board. In 1915, he went to the University of Cincinnati, where he majored in Social Sciences, Education, and Philosophy. He received a Ph.D. from there in 1920. He worked as executive director of the United Jewish Social Agencies in Cincinnati from 1919 to 1920.

In December 1920, Brickner became rabbi of the Holy Blossom Temple in Toronto, Canada. Under him, the Temple switched from Conservative to moderate Reform. He was president of the Toronto Federation of the Jewish Philanthropies and the Ontario Jewish Immigrant Aid Society, a member of the General Ministerial Association of Toronto, Chaplain of the Palestine Masonic Lodge, and a board member of various Jewish and non-Jewish institutions. He was a founder of the Ontario Jewish Immigrant Aid Society and served as vice-president of Canadian Hebrew Immigrant Aid Society. On behalf of those two organizations, he helped arrange for the Canadian government to admit five thousand Russian Jewish refugees stranded in Romania and settle them in Canada. He helped establish a Jewish agricultural training farm at Georgetown in 1924 and organized the United Jewish Farmers Association of Ontario. He was also a cofounder and associate editor of the weekly Canadian Jewish Review. When he left Canada in 1925, the University of Toronto established the Rabbi Brickner Scholarship in Social Science in his honor.

In 1925, Brickner became rabbi of Anshe Chesed Fairmount Temple in Cleveland, Ohio. He served as rabbi there for the next 33 years. Under him, the Temple grew from 700 families to over 2,500, making it the largest Reform congregation in the country. As rabbi, he created the first Young People's Congregation and reinstituted Hebrew in the Sunday School curriculum. He also established an annual institute on Judaism for Christian religious educators. He had a weekly radio program from the late 1920s to World War II. In 1928, he debated Clarence Darrow on "Is Man a Machine?" He served as president of the Bureau of Jewish Education from 1932 to 1940, and in 1935 he and Rabbi Abba Hillel Silver chaired the reorganized fundraising Jewish Welfare Board. He was also president of the Cleveland Zionist District, the local branch of the Zionist Organization of America.

Brickner instituted Sunday services at the Fairmont Temple, which attracted large audiences and improved the congregation's educational program, although it was later discontinued. An active Zionist and a significant figure in the United Palestine Appeal, he argued for the primacy of Israel in American Jewish life and advocated Reform rabbis study in Israel for a year. In 1942, he became chairman of the Central Conference of American Rabbis (CCAR) Committee on Chaplains, which recruited chaplains for the American armed forces. He was later appointed administrative chairman of the Jewish Welfare Board Committee on Army and Navy Activities and went on a world tour of American military bases. He received the Medal for Merit, America's highest civilian decoration, in 1947, the first rabbi to receive the honor. He wrote The History of the Jews of Canada in 1925 and The God Idea in Light of Modern Jewish Thought in 1930.

Brickner was an arbitrator for the dry-cleaning industry in Cleveland from 1928 to 1929, between the Cleveland Railroad Co. and the Street Car Men's Union from 1934 to 1935, and for the Employed Bakers of Cleveland from 1935 to 1936. He was a leader in opposing the ousting of the Cleveland city manager in 1930. He was chairman of the Jewish Welfare Fund Committee in Cleveland, chairman of the CCAR Social Justice Committee and its president from 1955 to 1956, an executive committee member of the Zionist Organization of America, an executive board member of the National Council for Jewish Education, a board member of the Union of American Hebrew Congregations, vice chairman of the Jewish Welfare Federation of Cleveland, and a member of the National Conference of Jewish Social Work, the Religious Education Association of America, the American Academy of Political and Social Science, the Foreign Policy Association of Jewish Academicians, and the Actions Committee of the World Zionist Organization,

In 1919, Brickner married Rebecca Ena Aaronson of Baltimore, Maryland. Their children were Joy Marian Brickner (wife of Samuel Rabinowitz) and Balfour Brickner.

Brickner died from a cerebral hemorrhage in Lorca, Spain, where he was stopping on his return from a visit to Israel under the auspices of the Union of American Hebrew Congregations, on May 14, 1958. His funeral service was held at the Fairmont Temple, with Rabbis Philip Horowitz and Bernard Perelmuter of the Fairmont Temple, Rabbi Abba Hillel Silver of the Temple, and Rabbi James G. Heller of New York City participating in the funeral service. He was buried in Mayfield Cemetery.
