= Mayfield Cemetery =

Cemetery in Cleveland Heights, Cuyahoga County, Ohio

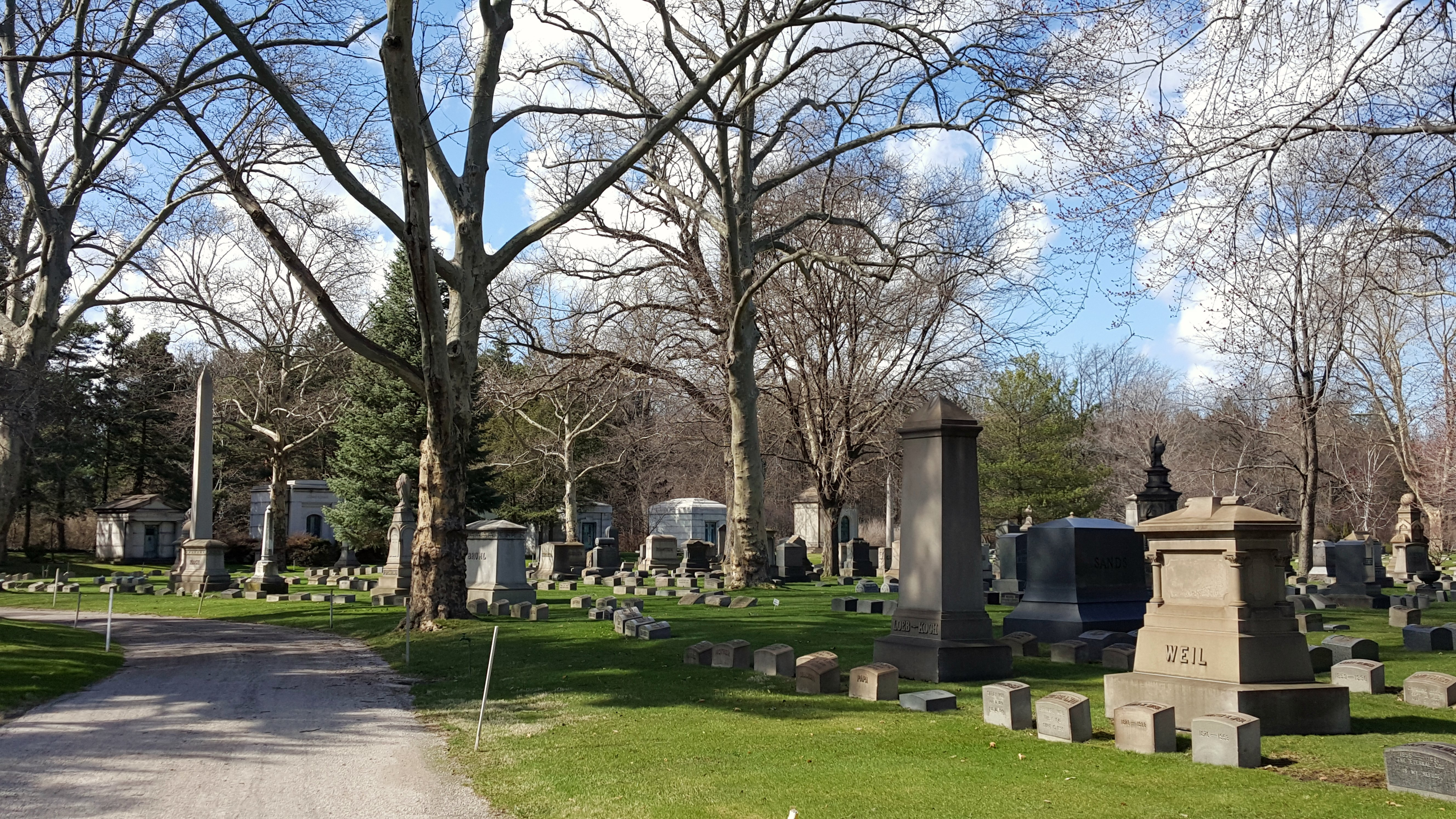
- Looking northwest through Mayfield Cemetery
- Interactive map of Mayfield Cemetery

Details
- Established: July 31, 1887
- Location: Cleveland Heights, Ohio
- Country: United States
- Coordinates: 41.513861°N 81.582283°W
- Type: Private
- Owned by: United Jewish Cemeteries of Cleveland
- Size: 21 acres (85,000 m^{2})
- No. of graves: 12,000 (2007)
- Website: mayfieldcemetery.org
- The Political Graveyard: Mayfield Cemetery

Mayfield Cemetery is a historic Jewish cemetery located at 2749 Mayfield Road in Cleveland Heights, Ohio, United States. Established in 1890, it is one of the largest Jewish cemeteries in Cuyahoga County and the only Jewish garden cemetery. A chapel was constructed in 1893. This was demolished and a large mausoleum, which included a chapel, was built in 1930.

== History ==
=== Establishing Mayfield Cemetery ===
In 1839, Jews in Cleveland, Ohio, formed the Israelitic Society, which would support and represent the city's small Jewish community, act as a burial society, and provide worship services.

On April 1, 1840 the Israelitic Society petitioned Cleveland's City Council for a half-acre Jewish section of the city's Erie Street Cemetery. That request denied, on July 7, 1840 it purchased 1 acre (4,000 m^{2}) of land on Willett Street (now Fulton Street) in the Ohio City neighborhood of Cleveland, west of the Cuyahoga River. The Willett Street Cemetery became Cleveland's first Jewish burying ground.

German Orthodox members of the society left to form Cleveland's first congregation, Anshe Chesed, in 1841. The Israelitic Society merged into Anshe Chesed in 1845, and a year later the congregation erected a synagogue on Eagle Street. A portion of Anshe Chesed's members left to form their own temple, Tifereth Israel, in 1850, and in 1853 bought 0.5 acres (2,000 m^{2}) of land adjacent to the Willett Street Cemetery to form their own burying ground.

Over the next 30 years Cleveland's Jewish community grew and moved steadily to the eastern parts of the rapidly growing city. It was clear to the leaders of Tifereth Israel that the Willett Street Cemetery would not be able to accommodate burial needs for any length of time. Due to Ohio City's rapid growth, no land was available for expansion. On July 31, 1887, Tifereth Israel purchased 20.649 acres (83,560 m^{2}) of land on Mayfield Road in East Cleveland Township (now a part of Cleveland Heights) for the establishment of a new cemetery. The land was adjacent to Lakeview Cemetery. It was laid out as a garden cemetery, with winding paths and roads and extensive landscape plantings. Tifereth Israel and Anshe Chesed created a new organization, United Jewish Cemeteries of Cleveland, to own, operate, and maintain the cemetery on July 6, 1890. United Jewish Cemeteries also took ownership and responsibility for the two Jewish cemeteries on Willett Street.

=== Chapel and mausoleum ===
In 1892, construction began on a small chapel at Mayfield Cemetery to accommodate funeral services and matzevah services for dedicating headstones or grave markers. It was designed by architects Israel Lehman and Theodore Schmitt of the firm Lehman and Schmitt. Construction on the $11,000 structure began about May 1892, and it was expected to be dedicated on Thanksgiving Day in November 1892, about the same time that Rabbi Moses J. Gries took up his duties as the leader of Tifereth Israel. But dedication was put off until Memorial Day on May 30, 1893, this day (it was felt) being more appropriate to the dedication of a funeral chapel. The one-story, brick and stone structure measured 50 by 53 feet (15 by 16 m) in size. The octagonal stone structure seated 200. The firm also designed a receiving vault. It was renovated in 1913 at a cost of $10,000.

In 1900, construction began on a streetcar siding on the grounds of Mayfield Cemetery. The Cleveland Railway Company's Mayfield Line ran up Mayfield Road, and a waiting room was constructed at the entrance of the cemetery to accommodate visitors waiting to ride the streetcar. The siding ran deep into the cemetery, where a small shelter platform was constructed. A special funeral streetcar, with a bier for the casket and seats for mourners, was also provided. The siding largely followed a central line through the cemetery, The streetcar line remained open until 1949. After the streetcar stopped running, the curbside waiting room and interior shelter platform were removed. The siding's rails were not removed, but merely buried. For several decades, workers repairing roads or digging graves would discover these abandoned rails.

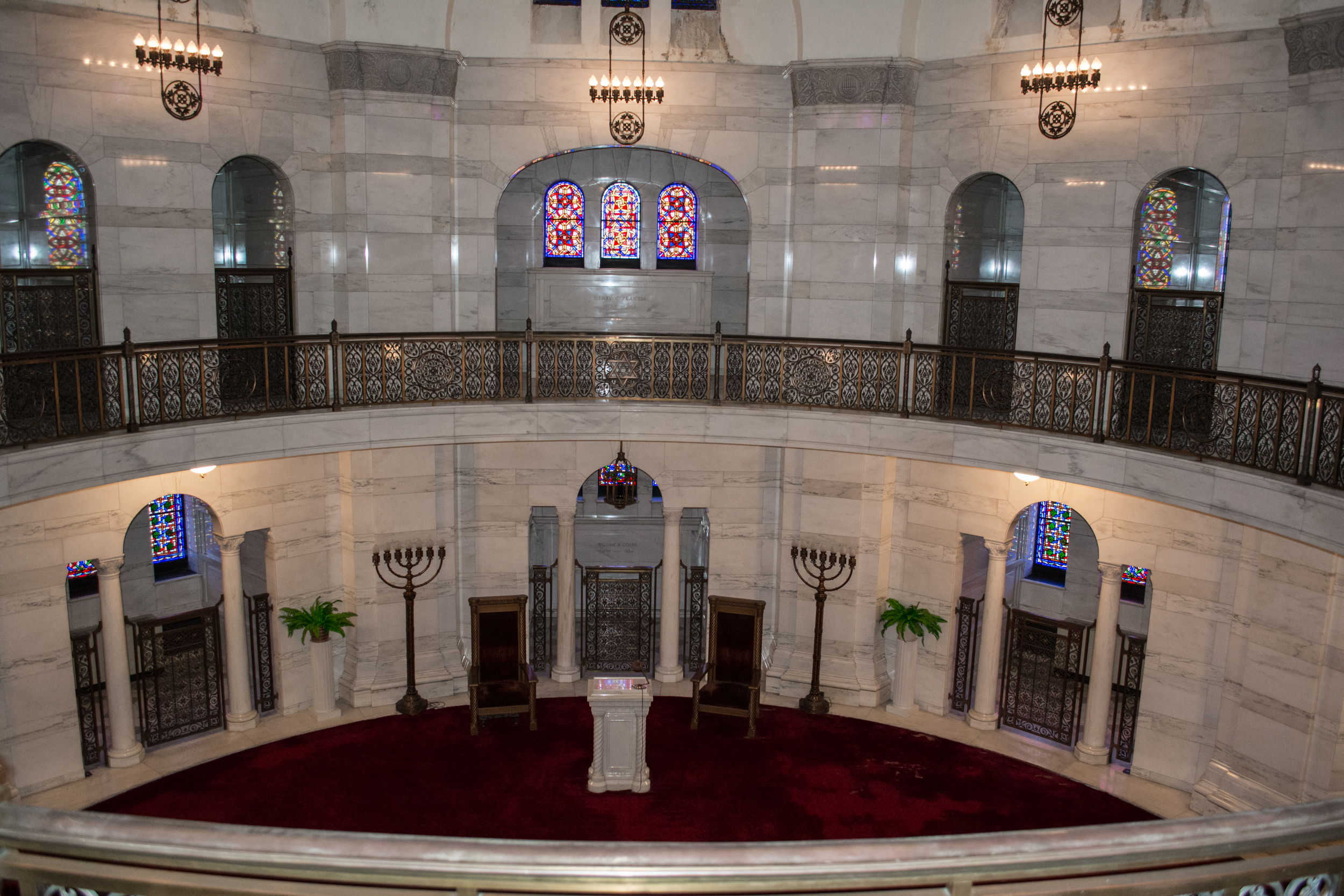
Chapel inside the 1929 mausoleum.

In 1929, cemetery officials decided to build a new, large mausoleum and chapel in the northwest corner of the cemetery. Noted mausoleum designer Sidney Lovell, of the Chicago architectural firm of Lovell & Lovell, was commissioned to design the structure. Local Cleveland architect Charles C. Colman was the supervising architect. The structure faced southeast, and consisted of a 100-foot (30 m) long main hall leading to an octagonal, double-shelled domed central structure approximately 75 feet (23 m) wide. There were three stories, one below-ground and two above-ground. Midway down the main hall, a curved staircase with bronze bannister on the northeast side of the hall led to the upper and lower levels. The octagonal center structure contained a two-story, 200-seat chapel with a mezzanine (reached from the second floor). The exterior was Light Cherokee Georgia marble, a white marble with light blue veins and clouds. Broad courses alternated with narrow courses. The broad courses had an axed (chiseled) finish, while the narrow courses had a honed (smooth with no gloss) finish. This created a banded effect. The interior was clad entirely in marble. The floors were pink Tennessee marble and cream "A" Alabama (or "madre") marble. The walls consisted of veined cream Alabama marble, while the ceilings were cream "A" Alabama. Originally, the mausoleum ceilings were designed to be only concrete, but Colman convinced the cemetery of the error of this design choice. The interior of the chapel was clad in Light Cherokee Georgia marble, with the same broad and narrow courses with differing finishes as the exterior. The staircase was also made of veined cream Alabama marble, with hand-carved and satin smooth curving walls and hermetically tight window soffits. The building had its own heating plant.

The mausoleum was designed with bronze gated side chambers, called "private rooms", which could contain five crypts (a "single room") or 10 to 12 crypts (a "double room"). In addition, niches could be filled with four to five tiers of crypts to create a "family section". Interior bronze work, such as gates and doors, were cast and finished by the John Harsch Bronze Foundry Co. The stained glass windows in the mausoleum were designed by Lovell & Lovell. The bronze temple menorah in the chapel were designed by Walter A. Sinz of the Herman N. Matzen Studio, and cast by the J. Harsh Company. Their style was Byzantine. The shaft consisted of four pilasters, each resembling a Solomonic column, around a smooth, circular central piece. The menorah was 3 feet (0.91 m) wide and 7 feet (2.1 m) tall, and took a year to cast. The mausoleum used a ventilation system, patented by Lovell, that provided fresh, dry air to each crypt to keep odor at a minimum and to prevent decomposition gases from building up and rupturing the vault.

The mausoleum was constructed by the Sam W. Emerson Co. When finished, it contained 757 crypts and 85 inurnment niches. The cost was $400,000, with another $200,000 raised for a maintenance endowment.

Two 75-foot (23 m) wings, jutting east and south from the main structure, were added to the mausoleum in the 1970s.

=== Operational history ===
Originally, Mayfield Cemetery was open to any member of the Jewish faith who wished to be buried there. But with both Anshe Chesed and Tifereth Israel rapidly growing after 1900, United Jewish Cemeteries of Cleveland decided in 1928 to restrict burials at Mayfield to members of these two congregations only.

In the mid 1980s, Mayfield Cemetery purchased 1 acre (4,000 m^{2}) of land from adjacent Lake View Cemetery.

As of 2007, the cemetery had about 12,000 burials.

== Notable interments ==
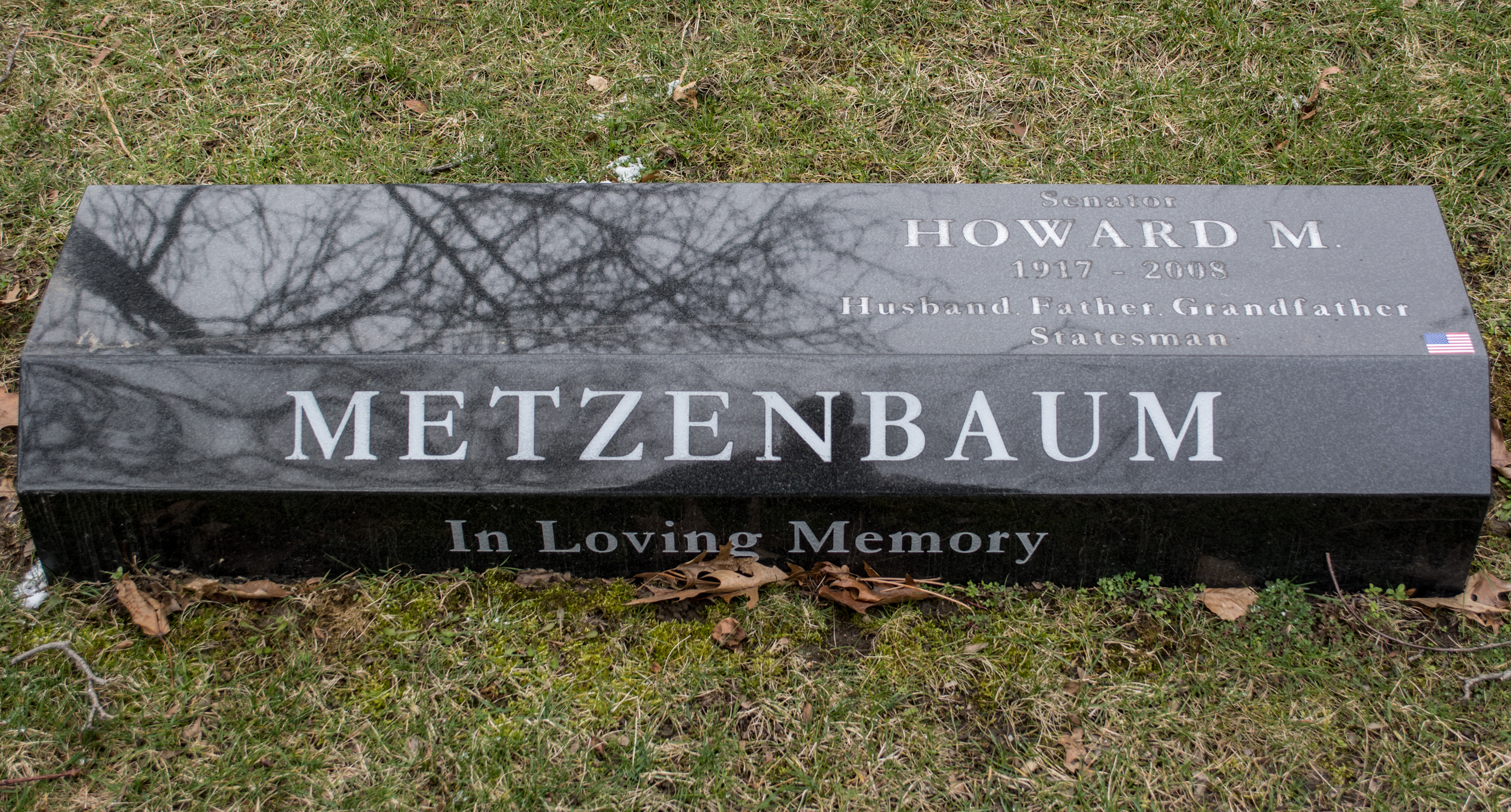
Grave of Senator Howard Metzenbaum at Mayfield Cemetery.

- David Mark Berger (1944-1972), Israeli-American Olympic weightlifter murdered at the 1972 Summer Olympic Games in Munich
- Barnett R. Brickner (1892–1958), rabbi
- Moses J. Gries (1866–1918), rabbi
- Martin A. Marks (1853–1916), businessman
- Israel J. Lehman (1859–1914), noted Cleveland-area architect
- Michaelis Machol (1845–1912), rabbi
- Abraham J. Sugerman (1902–1948), founder of the Cleveland Merchandise and Novelty Company
- Beryl Rubinstein (1898–1952), American pianist, composer, and teacher
- Abba Hillel Silver (1893–1963), American Rabbi and Zionist who mobilized support for the founding of the State of Israel
- Arthur (1894–1950) and Theresa (1889 or 1895–1982) Newman, parents of actor Paul Newman
- Arthur Lelyveld (1913–1996), rabbi and activist
- Howard A. Levy (1944-2007), chairman of the Anti-Defamation League’s Greater Cleveland branch, lawyer, and (in his later years) father-in-law of Geraldo Rivera
- Bert Wolstein (1927–2004), Cleveland real estate developer, professional soccer team owner, and philanthropist
- Howard Metzenbaum (1917–2008), U.S. Senator from Ohio from 1976 to 1995
- Peter B. Lewis (1933–2013), billionaire chairman of Progressive Insurance
- Rebecca Alison Meyer (2008–2014), who died of cancer at age 6, and was the daughter of web design consultant and author Eric A. Meyer. The hex color #663399 was named "rebeccapurple" and added to the CSS color list in her memory.

== Bibliography ==
- American Jewish Committee (1900). American Jewish Year Book. Philadelphia: Jewish Publication Society of America.
- Keiser, Robert D. (2011). Cleveland Architects Database (PDF). Cleveland: Cleveland Landmarks Commission.
- Koykka, Arthur S. (1986). Project Remember: A National Index of Gravesites of Notable Americans. Algonac, Mich.: Reference Publishing. ISBN 9780917256226.
- Levy, Shawn (2010). Paul Newman: A Life. London: Aurum. ISBN 9781845135874.
- Lovell, Sidney; Lovell, McDonald (January 1932). "A Palace of Marble Studded with Glass and Bronze: The New Mayfield Mausoleum in Cleveland, Ohio, Has an Unusual 'Banded' Treatment on Both Exterior and Interior". Through the Ages: 6–12.
- Morton, Marian J. (2009). Cleveland Heights Congregations. Charleston, S.C.: Arcadia Publishing. ISBN 9780738561424.
- Orth, Samuel Peter (1910). History of Cleveland, Ohio. Chicago: S.J. Clarke Publishing Co. p. 381. "Mayfield Cemetery 1887."
- Toman, Jim; Hays, Blaine S. (1996). Horse Trails to Regional Rails: The Story of Public Transit in Greater Cleveland. Kent, Ohio: Kent State University Press. ISBN 9780873385473.
- Vigil, Vicki Blum (2007). Cemeteries of Northeast Ohio: Stones, Symbols and Stories. Cleveland: Gray & Co. ISBN 9781598510256.
- Who Was Who in American History: Arts and Letters. Chicago: Marquis Who's Who. 1975. ISBN 9780837933016.
