= Michaelis Machol =

American rabbi (1845–1912)

Michaelis Machol (November 18, 1845 – August 26, 1912) was a German-born American rabbi who ministered in Cleveland for thirty years.

== Life ==
Machol was born on November 18, 1845, in Kolmar, Posen, Prussia, the son of Zadik and Esther Machol. His father was a merchant.

Machol attended the Schneidemuehl gymnasium. He then attended the University of Breslau as a special student from 1866 to 1869, and in 1869 he received a Ph.D. from the University of Jena. He also attended the teachers' department of the Jewish Theological Seminary of Breslau and was ordained a rabbi. In 1869, he immigrated to America and became rabbi of Temple B’nai Jeshurun in Leavenworth, Kansas. He served as rabbi there until 1872, when he was named associate rabbi of Kehilath Anshe Maarav in Chicago, Illinois, under Liebman Adler.

In 1876, he became rabbi of Anshe Chesed in Cleveland, Ohio, a position he held until he retired as rabbi emeritus in 1907. There, he advanced a moderate Reform Judaism by instituting occasional English sermons, installing an organ, and moving to uncover heads, but demonstrated personal Conservative leanings in sermons and articles that opposed the destruction of every ceremony. As rabbi, he oversaw the congregation's growth in the 1880s. He helped organize new buildings for the congregation in 1887 and 1912. In 1890, he worked out an agreement with Temple Tifereth-Israel to jointly own the Mayfield Cemetery. In 1901, he joined other rabbis and lay leaders in opposing the Cleveland school board's decision to begin every day with the Lord's Prayer, the Ten Commandments, and the 23rd Psalm. He was succeeded by Rabbi Louis Wolsey in 1906.

Machol was a member of the Freemasons. In 1871, he married Minnie Rosenthal, daughter of Rabbi Bernhard Rosenthal of Württemberg. Their children were Jacob, Henry, Bernhard, Gertrude, and Ernest.

Machol died in the West Vernon Hotel in Denver, Colorado, on August 26, 1912. He was visiting his son Henry in Idaho Springs with his wife, but he suffered a stroke in Denver while on his way home. He died a few days later. His funeral in the Mayfield chapel in Cleveland was attended by, among other people, the Anshe Chesed board of trustees and the officers and executive board of the Cleveland Council of Jewish Women. The funeral was conducted by Rabbi Louis Wolsey and Rabbi Samuel Wolfenstein. He was buried in Mayfield Cemetery.
