= Martin A. Marks =

Martin A. Marks (February 6, 1853 – August 31, 1916) was a Jewish-American businessman from Cleveland, Ohio.

== Life ==
Marks was born on February 6, 1853, in Madison, Indiana, the son of German immigrants Aaron Marks and Sarah August. He attended public school until he began working at thirteen.

Marks initially worked at his father's store, and he later became a member of the firm A. Marks & Co. In 1887, he moved to Cleveland, Ohio, and became a member of the firm Klein, Marks & Co. He joined the Northwestern Mutual Life Insurance Co. in 1890. He later became Northeast Ohio manager of the Equitable Life Assurance Society of New York, working there for fourteen years until he resigned and went to Europe to improve his health. He became a director of his father-in-law's firm Cleveland Worsted Mills Co. in 1902, and from 1906 to his death he served as its secretary-treasurer. He was also a director of the First National Bank and an executive committee member of the Guardian Savings and Trust Company.

Marks was appointed a trustee of the Jewish Orphan Home in 1885. He served as president of Temple Tifereth-Israel from 1890 to 1894 and from 1906 to 1915. He was president of the Temple when Moses J. Gries was hired as the congregation's rabbi, and when Gries proposed the creation of the Educational League to provide higher education opportunities for orphans he served as its first president. He helped establish the Federation of Jewish Charities in 1903, was later appointed a member of a Federation committee that reviewed and reported on all immigration bills proposed in Congress. He also founded the Federation of Charity & Philanthropy in 1913 and chaired its Committee on Benevolent Associations of the Chamber of Commerce.

By 1905, Marks was a director of the Cleveland Jewish Orphan Asylum, a trustee of the National Jewish Hospital for Consumptives in Denver, Colorado, chairman of the Cleveland Chamber of Commerce Committee on Benevolent Association, an executive board member of the Cleveland Council of Sociology, vice-president of the Anti-Tuberculosis League, an executive board member of the Municipal Association and the Public Library Board, treasurer of the Covenant Endowment Fund of the B'nai B'rith Grand Lodge No. 2 as well as the Lodge's former president, and president of the Indiana Society of Ohio.

Marks was an officer of the local Freemason lodge and Royal Arch Masonry council, an executive council member of the Union of American Hebrew Congregations, and a member of the Excelsior Club, the Oakwood Club, the Cleveland Athletic Club, and the Cleveland Automobile Club. In 1885, he married Belle Hays, daughter of merchant and banker Kaufman Hays. Their children were Florence Moss and Ethel Kingsbacher.

Marks died in Jackson, New Hampshire, where he went with his family in an attempt to improve his health, on August 31, 1916. Rabbi Moses J. Gries conducted a private funeral service for the immediate family at the family home, while former Jewish Orphan Asylum superintendent Samuel Wolfenstein officiated a public funeral in the Mayfield Cemetery chapel, which was overcrowded to the point where many attendees had to stand outside the chapel.
