= W. Sterling Cary =

American Christian minister (1927–2021)

The Reverend W. Sterling Cary
- Cary in the 1970s

President of the National Council of Churches
- In office December 7, 1972 – October 11, 1975
- Preceded by: Cynthia Clark Wedel
- Succeeded by: William Phelps Thompson

Personal details
- Born: William Sterling Cary; August 10, 1927; Plainfield, New Jersey, U.S.
- Died: November 14, 2021 (aged 94); Flossmoor, Illinois, U.S.
- Education: Morehouse College (BA); Union Theological Seminary (BD)

William Sterling Cary (August 10, 1927 – November 14, 2021) was an American Christian minister. From 1972 to 1975, he was the first Black president of the National Council of Churches (NCC) in its history.

Born and raised in Plainfield, New Jersey, Cary earned a Bachelor of Arts degree in 1949 from Morehouse College, where he served as student body president. He was ordained a Baptist minister and studied at Union Theological Seminary, receiving a Bachelor of Divinity degree in 1952. Unable to find a position in a Baptist church, he became a pastor at a Presbyterian church from 1952 to 1955 in Youngstown, Ohio, and then at an experimental interdenominational church in Brooklyn. Cary changed his denominational affiliation to the United Church of Christ (UCC) in 1958. He became increasingly active in the Black liberation theology movement in the 1960s, advocating for racial justice and equality within the UCC and on a broader scale.

He was elected administrator of the New York Metropolitan Association of the UCC in 1968, and four years later he was unanimously elected to a three-year term as president of the National Council of Churches. Cary was a harsh critic of U.S. President Richard Nixon's budget cuts to affordable housing and anti-poverty measures. Though he disagreed with Nixon's successor, Gerald Ford, on issues related to the Vietnam War, they rekindled a long-neglected relationship between the NCC and the White House, and Ford later appointed Cary to an advisory committee that oversaw the resettlement of South Asian refugees in the United States. After Cary's presidency ended, he continued in his role as the executive minister of the Illinois conference of the UCC until his retirement in 1994.

== Early life and education ==
Cary was born in Plainfield, New Jersey, on August 10, 1927. His father, Andrew Jackson Cary, was a real estate broker, and his mother, Sadie Walker, was a homemaker. He had seven siblings. Growing up in Plainfield, he was active in the Boy Scouts of America, and attended Washington School where he was the founding president of the junior high YMCA club and the eighth-grade class president. In 1944, the Courier News called Cary "the boy preacher" in an announcement of his sermon for Young People's Day at a local AME church.

He graduated from Plainfield High School in 1945. After the dean of the mostly white high school told him that he had lost an election for student body president—an election he believed he had resoundingly won—he decided to enroll in the all-black Morehouse College in Atlanta, Georgia. At Morehouse, Cary majored in sociology and occasionally returned to Plainfield to preach at Calvary Baptist Church; by 1947, he was an assistant pastor there. He was a member of the Kappa Alpha Psi fraternity and was elected student body president in 1948. The same year, he was ordained a Baptist minister then graduated with a Bachelor of Arts degree in 1949.

Cary continued his studies at Union Theological Seminary in New York City while also serving as a student assistant to the minister of Grace Congregational Church. In 1950, at the end of his first year, he was elected class president for the upcoming year becoming the first Black class president in the seminary's history. He was elected student body president the following year and graduated with a Master of Divinity degree in 1952.

== Career ==
=== Early ministry (1952–1964) ===
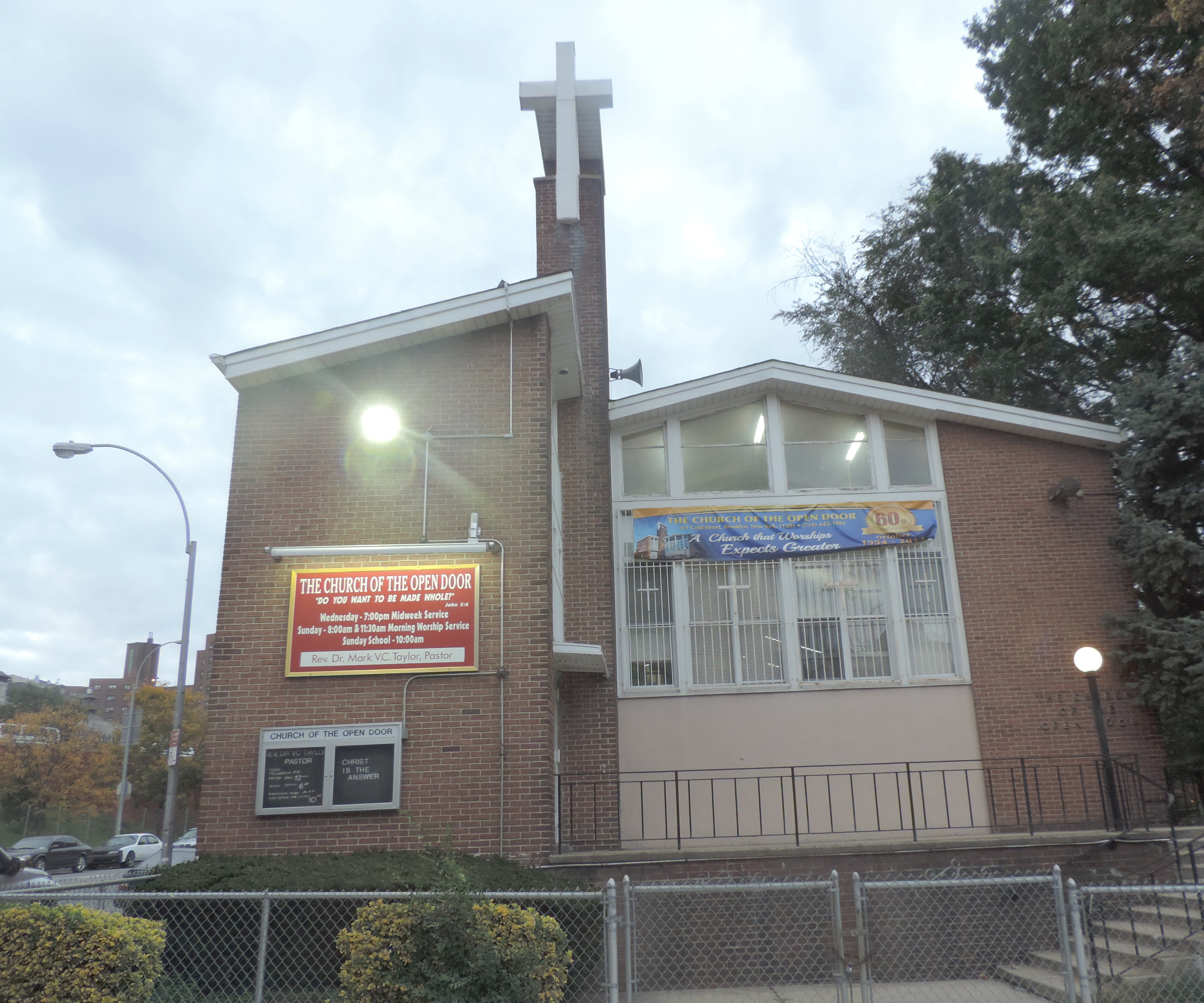
The Church of the Open Door in 2014

Cary worked in a factory after graduating from Union Theological Seminary because he had been unable to find a position in a Baptist church. He moved to Youngstown, Ohio, to become the pastor of Butler Memorial Presbyterian Church from 1952 to 1955. During that time, he co-chaired the United Negro College Fund in Youngstown and was active in other local organizations and committees including the YMCA and the Mahoning County Mental Health Council. He married Marie Belle Phillips, a teacher in the SoHo school system, on July 11, 1953. They were married in Carron Street Baptist Church in Pittsburgh, Pennsylvania, and later had four children: Yvonne, Denise, Patricia, and W. Sterling Jr. In December 1955, Cary was assigned to be the pastor at an interdenominational and interracial church in Brooklyn that included the Baptist, Congregational Christian, Methodist, Presbyterian, and Reformed denominations. It was the first interdenominational church built in a public housing project in the United States. He began his position at the church, named the Church of the Open Door, on January 1, 1956.

In July 1958, Cary was named the pastor at Grace Congregational Church where he was previously a student assistant to the minister during his seminary studies. He changed his denominational affiliation from Baptist to the United Church of Christ (UCC) and began his new position on September 1, 1958, succeeding Herbert King who had resigned to become a professor at McCormick Theological Seminary. Cary participated in several discussions on juvenile delinquency including a televised panel discussion on NBC's "Frontiers of Faith" series in 1961. He was a speaker at a 1963 rally between the New York NAACP and Governor Nelson Rockefeller and frequently spoke on racial issues in the 1960s. After the Harlem riot of 1964, while not condoning the rioting, he called for the suspension of the shooter, Lieutenant Thomas Gilligan, and the establishment of a civilian board to examine allegations of police brutality.

=== Towards Black liberation theology (1965–1971) ===
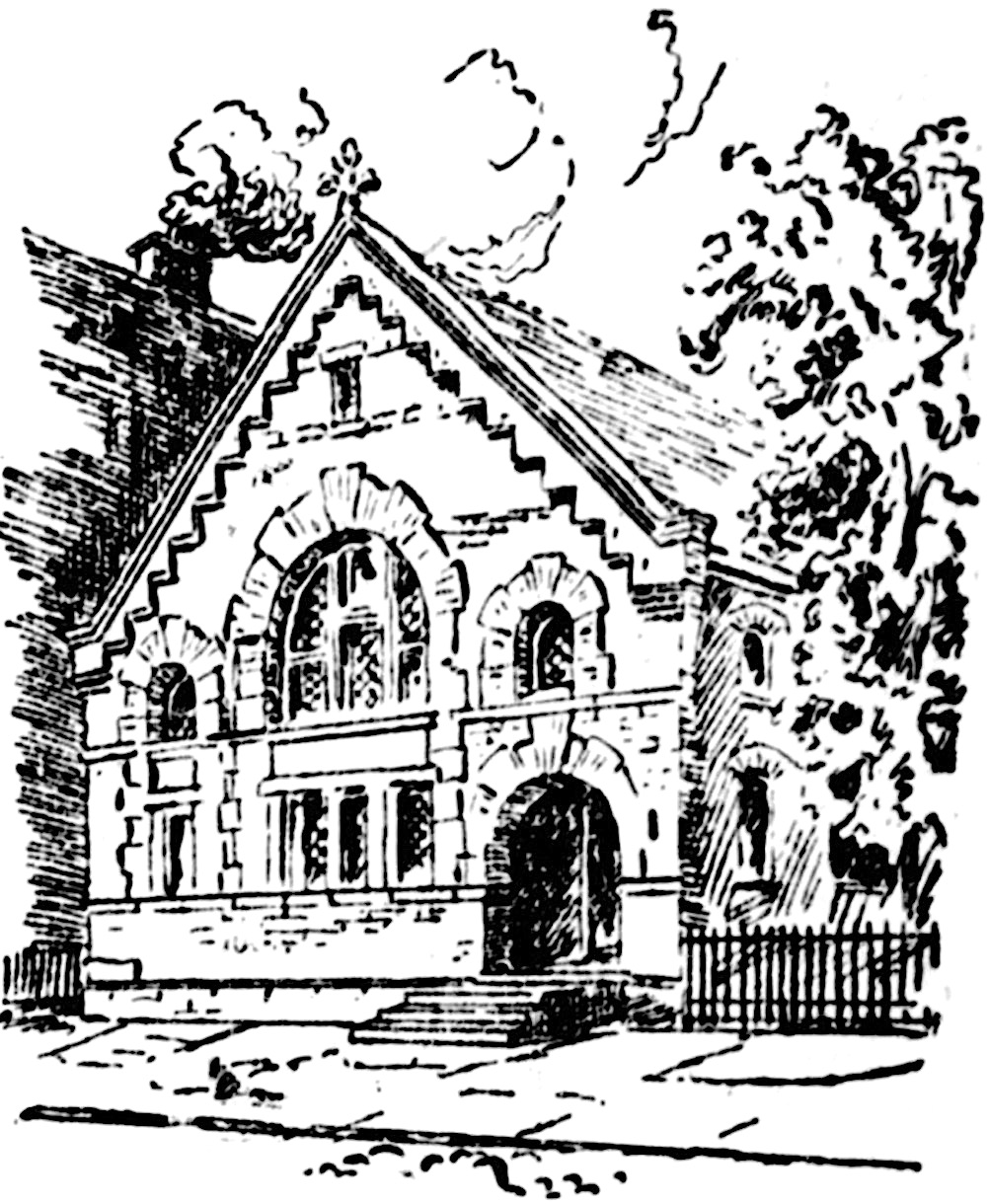
Illustration of the Grace Congregational Church building where Cary preached from 1958 to 1968

Cary was elected committee chairman of a permanent "National Committee for Racial Justice Now" authorized by the United Church of Christ in 1965. At the annual UCC assembly in 1966, he condemned the Ku Klux Klan and other "insane bigoted mobs", and forcefully called for high-quality integrated schools and fairer employment laws. He was named executive coordinator of the committee in March 1966; at that time, he was also the vice president of the Manhattan division of the Protestant Council of the City of New York and a member of the Mayor of New York's youth task force. Cary advocated for racial justice both within the UCC, calling for increased funding to build new churches in Black communities, and on a broader scale by helping to establish the "National Committee of Negro Churchmen" which promoted the Black Power movement. The organization purchased a full-page ad in The New York Times demanding changes to segregated schools and discriminatory laws.

At the Vermont Conference of the UCC in September 1966, Cary continued to advocate for the Black Power movement and Black liberation theology stating that "equality will come not by goodwill or love, but by the Negro's achieving independence, strength and some measure of wealth." After his lectures, the conference ministers voted to adopt several race-related resolutions, including lobbying the state government for open housing and encouraging churches to appoint more Black pastors. In his role as chairman of the National Committee for Racial Justice Now, Cary also called on the UCC to protect ministers who spoke out on racial issues and other controversial topics such as the Vietnam War while also criticizing the firing of some outspoken ministers.

In June 1968, he was elected administrator of the New York Metropolitan Association of the United Church of Christ, a position in which he oversaw 77 churches in the district comprising approximately 36,000 UCC members. He was the first Black minister to hold the position. He was a signer of the 1969 Black Manifesto that called for white churches and synagogues to pay hundreds of millions of dollars in reparations. Cary opposed a 1971 effort to reorganize Protestant and Orthodox denominations into a tiered system with increased separation between individual denominations.

=== National Council of Churches (1972–1975) ===
The Minneapolis Star reported in September 1972 that Cary would be put forth by a nominating committee for president of the National Council of Churches, the largest ecumenical body in the United States, and that he was expected to be elected. Running unopposed, he was unanimously elected to a three-year term at the NCC's general assembly in Dallas, Texas, on December 7, 1972. Cary succeeded Cynthia Clark Wedel, was the first Black president of the NCC, and its youngest president at the time. Upon his election, he pledged to focus on integrating churches, uniting different denominations, and advocating for affordable housing and education. At the Dallas meeting, the NCC general assembly also voted to establish a new, more diverse governing body to be rolled out during Cary's first year in office. In February 1973, Cary joined other religious leaders, including Paul Moore Jr. and Balfour Brickner, in criticizing President Richard Nixon's proposed budget which decreased funding for affordable housing and other anti-poverty measures. He accused Nixon of "declar[ing] war on the poor people and members of this country's minorities" and called on Congress to reject the budget. After Nixon fired Archibald Cox during the Watergate scandal, Cary released a statement urging Congress to "examine the President's fitness to remain in office".

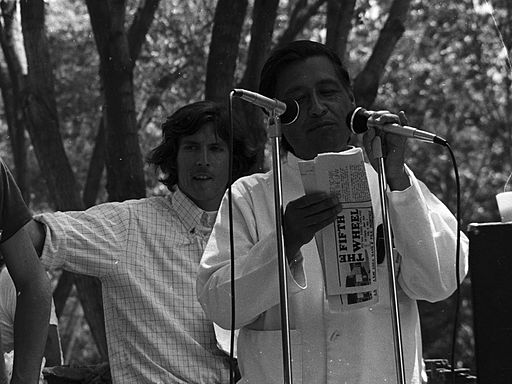
Cesar Chavez speaking at a United Farm Workers rally in 1974

At his first NCC governing board meeting, the board voted to direct its member churches to evaluate a study paper on abortion in a move toward advancing Cary's goal of establishing a formal relationship with the Catholic Church. In May 1973, he received an honorary Doctor of Laws degree from Bishop College in Dallas for "unique Christian humanism predicated upon justice for all". That same month, Cary and NCC General Secretary R. H. Edwin Espy apologized for and retracted a statement they had sent to the House Committee on Ways and Means opposing tax credits for students attending private schools, after they had received backlash from Catholic bishops. Cary was a vocal supporter of the United Farm Workers' grape strike led by Cesar Chavez. In 1974, he advocated for amnesty for draft evaders in the Vietnam War. He later praised President Gerald Ford's call for conditional amnesty while urging the president to make it unconditional. Cary moved to Chicago, Illinois, after he was elected executive minister of the Illinois Conference of the United Church of Christ in September 1974. This made him the first Black executive minister in the conference's history. In February 1975, Cary and other religious leaders met with Ford; it was the first time in a decade that church leaders were invited to the White House. The meeting re-established the relationship between the NCC and the White House, though Ford and church leaders continued to disagree on issues like amnesty and Vietnam aid.

In the aftermath of the Vietnam War, he was appointed by President Ford to a 17-member advisory committee to oversee the resettlement of Southeast Asian refugees. In March 1975, the NCC voted for the first time to support gay rights passing a resolution that condemned discrimination on the basis of "affectional or sexual preference". At the same meeting, the governing board voted in support of the Equal Rights Amendment and resolved to investigate Cary's claim that the Nixon administration had bugged NCC phones in order to conduct special tax audits of the organization. He sharply criticized Operation Babylift, in which children were mass-evacuated from South Vietnam to the United States, accusing the U.S. government of staging the operation for political gain and saying that the Vietnamese people described it an "insensitive kidnap operation". Ebony named Cary among the 100 most influential Black Americans in both 1974 and 1975. Cary's three-year term as NCC president ended on October 11, 1975, when the governing board elected William Phelps Thompson who was the chief executive of the United Presbyterian Church at the time.

=== Post-presidential ministry (1976–1994) ===
After his presidency, Cary continued in his role as the Illinois conference minister and continued his calls for Black churches to combat racial injustice. In 1981, he was elected chair of the Council of Conference Executives of the UCC. Cary was one of six finalists considered by a nominating committee for UCC president in 1989, though he was not ultimately selected as the nominee. He retired in 1994 after two decades as the Illinois conference minister.

== Death ==
After a long illness, Cary died of heart failure in his home in Flossmoor, Illinois, on November 14, 2021. He was 94 years old. He was survived by his wife of 68 years, Marie Belle, four children, two grandchildren, and three great-grandchildren.
