= Beryl Rubinstein =

American pianist and composer (1898 - 1952)

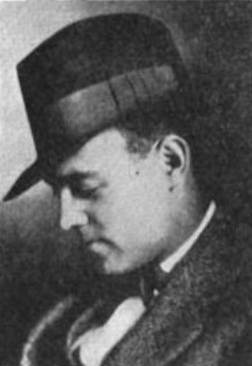
- Born: October 26, 1898; Athens, Georgia
- Died: December 29, 1952 (aged 54); Cleveland, Ohio
- Burial place: Mayfield Cemetery
- Spouse: Elsa Landesman (m. 1925)

Beryl Rubinstein (October 26, 1898 – December 29, 1952) was an American pianist, composer, and teacher. He was the father of social historian David Rubinstein.

He married Elsa Landesman who attended Wellesley College. They were married by Abba Hillel Silver, a leading American Zionist, on December 29, 1925.

== Biography ==
Rubinstein was born in Athens, Georgia, where his father Isaac Rubinstein was the rabbi of the Congregation of the Children of Israel. He was a child prodigy on the piano, and made his New York City debut in 1911, with a concert at the Metropolitan Opera House. He then studied piano in Berlin, Germany with Ferruccio Busoni and others, making his debut in New York City in a joint concert with Eugène Ysaÿe in 1916. There followed several American and European tours. He also toured as an assistant pianist for the Duncan Dancers, a troupe headed by Isadora Duncan. In 1921 he joined the music faculty of the Cleveland Institute of Music, serving as the institution's director from 1932 until his death. He wrote an Outline of Piano Pedagogy (1929); among the works he composed were a piano concerto, a string quartet, and numerous pieces and studies for piano solo. Composer Jane Corner Young was one of his students.

After the U.S. entry into World War II, Rubinstein (then 43) enlisted in the U.S. Army with the rank of captain in the Fifth Service Command. He was given the role of coordinating the unit's wartime musical activities. From 1942 to 1944 he traveled 20,000 miles and participated in seventy-five concerts for servicemen in North Africa, Sicily, and Italy.

After the war Rubinstein returned to Cleveland to resume the directorship of CIM, which expanded greatly over the next decade.

Rubinstein died in Cleveland, Ohio, in 1952 and was buried at Mayfield Cemetery. He was survived by his wife, his son David, and his daughter Ellen Weld.
