= Jerome Davis (nose tackle) =

American football player (born 1962)

No. 98
- Position: Nose tackle

Personal information
- Born: February 27, 1962 (age 64); Cincinnati, Ohio, U.S.
- Listed height: 6 ft 1 in (1.85 m)
- Listed weight: 260 lb (118 kg)

Career information
- High school: Hughes (Cincinnati)
- College: Ball State
- NFL draft: 1986: undrafted

Career history
- Detroit Lions (1987)
- Stats at Pro Football Reference

Jerome A. Davis (born February 27, 1962) is an American former professional football nose tackle who played one season with the Detroit Lions of the National Football League (NFL). He played college football at Illinois Valley Community College and Ball State University.

== Early life and college ==
Jerome A. Davis was born on February 27, 1962, in Cincinnati, Ohio. He attended Hughes STEM High School in Cincinnati.

Davis firs played college football at Illinois Valley Community College from 1982 to 1983. He then transferred to Ball State University, where he was a two-year letterman for the Ball State Cardinals from 1984 to 1985.

== Professional career ==
On September 27, 1987, Davis signed with the Detroit Lions of the National Football League (NFL) during the 1987 NFL players strike. He started all three strike games for the Lions. He was released on October 19, 1987, after the strike ended. He wore jersey number 98 while with the Lions. Davis stood 6'1" and weighed 260 pounds. He was signed by the Lions again February 21, 1988. He was later released on August 8, 1988.
