= Anshe Chesed Fairmount Temple =

Reform Jewish temple in Beachwood, Ohio, US

- Location in Ohio

Religion
- Affiliation: Reform Judaism
- Ecclesiastical or organizational status: Synagogue
- Leadership: Rabbi Robert Nosanchuk; Rabbi Dr. Joshua Caruso; Rabbi Elle Muhlbaum (Associate)
- Status: Closed due to merger

Location
- Location: 23737 Fairmount Boulevard, Beachwood, Cleveland, Ohio 44122
- Country: United States
- Interactive map of Anshe Chesed Fairmount Temple
- Coordinates: 41°29′15″N 81°30′41″W

Architecture
- Type: Synagogue architecture
- Established: 1842 (as a congregation)
- Completed: 1846 (Eagle Street); 1887 (East 25th Street); 1912 (Euclid Avenue); 1957 (Beachwood)

Website
- fairmounttemple.org

Anshe Chesed Fairmount Temple (transliterated from Hebrew as "People of Loving Kindness"), commonly called the Fairmount Temple, was a Reform Jewish congregation and synagogue, located at 23737 Fairmount Boulevard, in Beachwood, Ohio, in the United States. The congregation was the oldest Jewish congregation in the Cleveland area through mid-2024. The congregation's membership exceeded 2,000 families in the mid-1990s.

The synagogue was a member of the Union for Reform Judaism. On 1 July 2024, Fairmount Temple merged with Temple Tifereth-Israel to create a new Reform congregation, Mishkan Or.

== History ==
In 1841, the congregation was established as a German Orthodox synagogue and officially chartered on February 28, 1842. In 1845, the Israelitic Anshe Chesed Society was formed when the Israelite Society (part of the original congregation) merged with Anshe Chesed. The following year, the congregation built Cleveland's first synagogue on Eagle Street, now where Progressive Field is located.

Michaelis Machol served as rabbi from 1876 to 1907. In 1887, the congregation moved out of downtown toward the then newly built neighborhoods on the east side of Cleveland along with the rest of the Jewish community of Cleveland, and dedicated its second building on East 25th Street and Scovill Avenue.

In 1912, the congregation moved further east when it built a new synagogue on East 82nd Street and Euclid Avenue. The mammoth synagogue became known as the Euclid Avenue Temple.

In the mid-1800s it became a member of the Union of American Hebrew Congregations for two years, then left, to rejoin in 1907 and adopt the Union Prayer Book when Louis Wolsey, its first American-born American-educated rabbi became its spiritual leader. Wolsey led the congregation from 1907 to 1924. Barnett R. Brickner was rabbi of the congregation from 1925 until his death in 1958.

=== Beachwood zoning and antisemitism conflict ===
In 1948, a heated village wide debate was sparked in Beachwood after the proposal of the construction of the Anshe Chesed Fairmount Temple following the purchase of 32 acres of land on which the temple stood. The debate was started due to the rapidly growing popular trend of families moving to the suburbs due to the booming post WWII economy. Considering that Beachwood at the time was a relatively small community with few Jews, the sudden proposal of the large synagogue of 1,800 families sparked anti-Semitic worries among the village's community due to the imminent demographics change that the establishment of a large synagogue would bring. The village council, no member of which was Jewish, cited in 1952 that the establishment of Anshe Chesed "would be detrimental to the public safety, welfare, and convenience of the village". One morning in May 1952, following Anshe Chesed's threat to sue the village of Beachwood, residents opened their mailboxes and found a white supremacist newspaper called The Plain Truth, with the message:

"The battle is on. No longer should we sit idly by and watch our country be taken from us. Act now. Let not the Jew plan succeed."

— The Plain Truth, May 1952.

Zoning arguments between the village and the congregation regarding the temple's construction sparked an Ohio Supreme Court case which ruled in 1954 that the synagogue must be allowed to be built, as well as with issuing state building permits to the congregation. The temple's construction was finished in 1957 and the congregation's present home, the Fairmount Temple, was dedicated. In 1958, Rabbi Arthur Lelyveld, former national director of B'nai B'rith Hillel Foundation was hired.

== Later events ==
On April 13, 2023, a fire broke out on the roof of the building. Firefighters from eight neighboring cities responded. No one was injured and all the Torahs were safely removed from the sanctuary.

On June 18, 2024, the city of Beachwood agreed to purchase the Anshe Chesed Fairmount Temple for eight million dollars, following Anshe's Chessed's merger with Temple-Tifereth Israel, to become Congregation Mishkan Or.

The final clergy team consisted of Senior Rabbi Robert A. Nosanchuk, Rabbi Joshua L. Caruso, Associate Rabbi Elle Muhlbaum, Cantor Vladimir Lapin, and Cantor Laureate Sarah Sager. All the active clergy members in mid-2024 became clergy at Congregation Mishkan Or.

== Notable members ==
- David Mark Berger, American-born Israeli Olympian who was killed during the Munich massacre at the 1972 Summer Olympics.
- Brad Goldberg, major league baseball pitcher, became bar mitzvah at Anshe Chesed Fairmount Temple.
- Howard Metzenbaum, the only Jewish Senator from Ohio.
- Rebecca Alison Meyer, a daughter of web designer and author Eric A. Meyer. The hex color #663399 was named "rebeccapurple" and added to the CSS color list in her memory.
