= Hughes STEM High School =

Public high school in Cincinnati, Ohio, United States

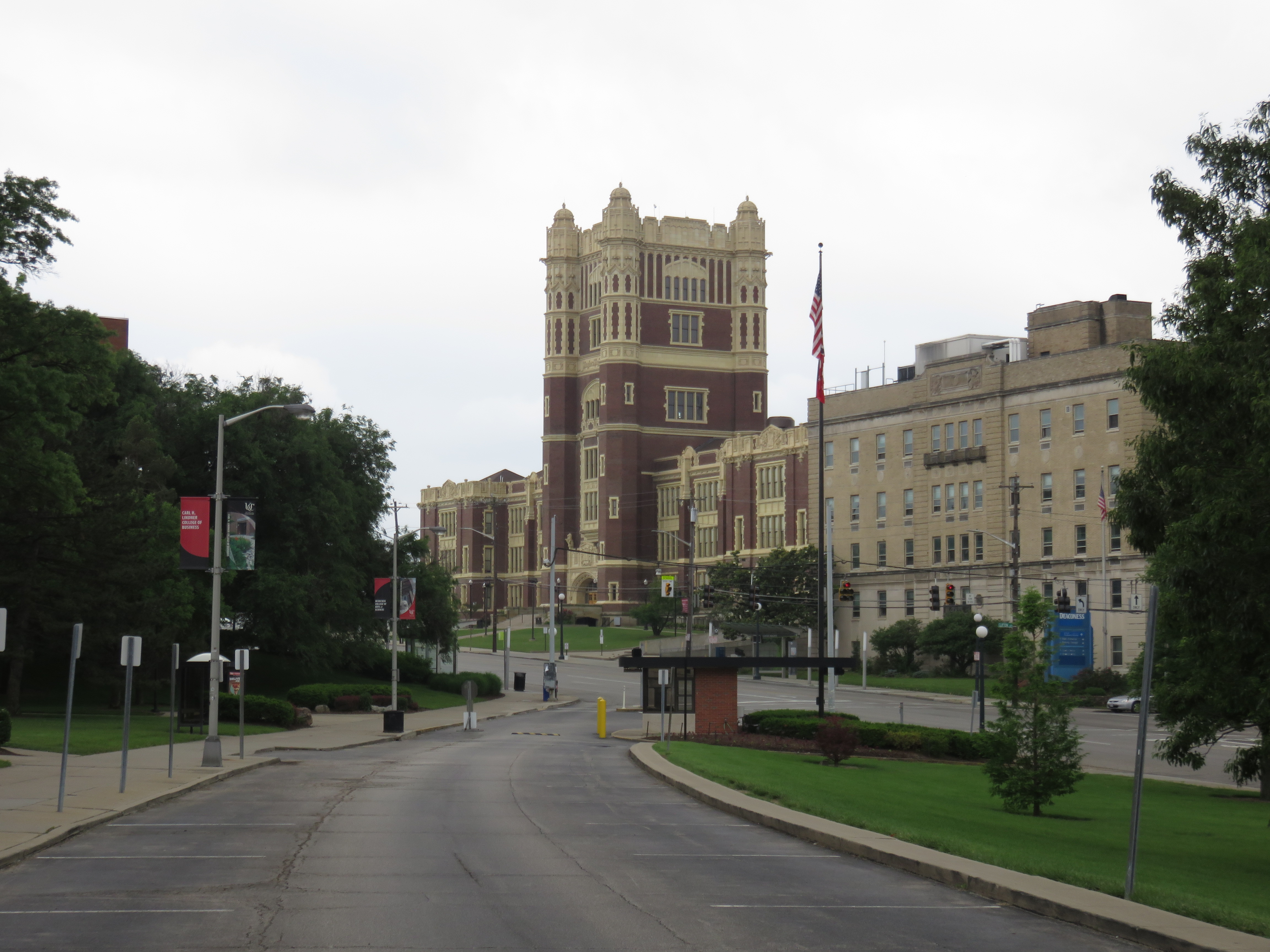
- Hughes High School in 2017

Location
- 2515 Clifton Avenue; Cincinnati, (Hamilton County), Ohio 45219; United States; 39°7′43″N 84°31′18″W

Information
- Type: Public, coeducational high school
- Established: 1847
- Founder: Thomas Hughes
- School district: Cincinnati Public Schools
- Superintendent: Shauna Murphy
- Principal: Jennifer S. Williams
- Grades: 9–12
- Colors: Red and white
- Athletics conference: Cincinnati Metro Athletic Conference
- Team name: Big Red
- Accreditation: North Central Association of Colleges and Schools
- Website: https://hughesstem.cps-k12.org/
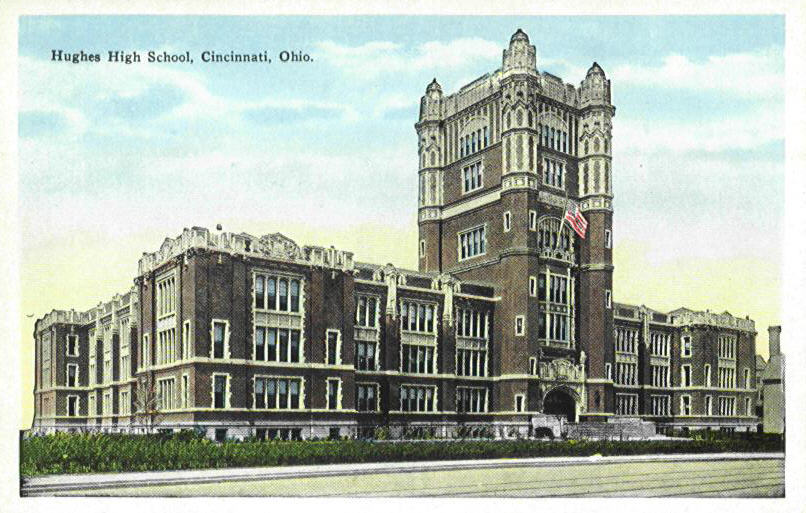
- Hughes as it appeared in the 1920s or early 1930s

Hughes STEM High School is a public high school located in Cincinnati, Ohio. It is part of the Cincinnati Public Schools.

== History ==
The first Hughes High School was established in 1853 on property on Fifth and Mound streets.

The school owes its name to Thomas Hughes, an Englishman and shoemaker, who, by his will, dated December, 1826, left his property for a high school, which was built in 1853 at a cost of $23,375.

=== Pre-Hughes Center ===
Thomas Hughes' vision, wherein he had bequeathed his land to be “applied to the maintenance and support of a school or schools in the City of Cincinnati for the education of poor destitute children whose parents or guardians are unable to pay for their schooling” came into fruition almost 30 years later. The first graduating class consisted of six girls and four boys. The school thereafter served a predominantly poor population of students.

=== Hughes Center ===
Hughes Center was a team-based magnet school dedicated to the Paideia philosophy. The Paideia philosophy is based upon the belief that all students can be successful in a rigorous college preparatory curriculum.

Programs available at Hughes Center included:

- Zoo Academy (a program offered in association with the Cincinnati Zoo and Botanical Garden)
- High School for Teaching and Technology
- High School for the Health Professions
- High School for the Communication Profession
- Cincinnati Academy for Mathematics and Science (CAMAS) High School
- The Paideia High School

The last principal of Hughes Center was Dr. Virginia Rhodes and the school program was closed with the graduating class of 2012.

=== Hughes STEM ===
Hughes STEM saw its first students in 2009. In response to national initiatives for STEM education in America's public schools, the school curriculum was redesigned to focus on related career fields. A NSF grant aimed at creating scalable models of STEM schools paid for much of the upstart and transition costs, many of which were related to technology equipment acquisition.

In 2011–2012 Hughes gained an 8th grade class and became a fully 7th–12th grade school the following school year.

== Athletics ==
=== Ohio High School Athletic Association state championships ===
- Boys Baseball - 1938, 1949
- Boys Swimming – 1930
- Boys Golf – 1928
- Boys Track and Field – 1925

== Notable alumni ==
- Wilbur G. Adam, painter and illustrator
- Kenneth G. Althaus, Brigadier general during World War II
- Alex Bannister, NFL football player
- Ken Blackwell, Mayor of Cincinnati, Ohio Secretary of State, and conservative activist
- DJ Brewton (born 2000), basketball player in the Israeli Basketball Premier League
- Jerome Davis, NFL football player
- Finis Farr, writer and CIA agent
- Andre Frazier, NFL football player
- Moses J. Gries, rabbi
- Louis Grossmann, rabbi
- Laurence Halstead, US Army brigadier general
- Libby Holman, singer and stage actress
- Loretta Cessor Manggrum, composer
- Bob Quick, NBA basketball player
- Abraham B. Rhine (1877–1941), rabbi
- Bob Smith, football player
- Arnold Spielberg, electrical engineer
- Joseph Baermann Strauss, Chief Engineer of Golden Gate Bridge
- Louis Wolsey, rabbi
