= Cynthia Clark Wedel =

American Episcopal leader (1908–1986)

- Born: August 26, 1908; Dearborn
- Died: August 24, 1986 (aged 77)
- Education: Northwestern University, George Washington University

Cynthia Clark Wedel (August 26, 1908 – August 24, 1986) was an Episcopal leader and educator. Wedel was the first woman to be named president of the National Council of Churches. She was elected one of the presidents of the World Council of Churches in 1975.

== Early life and education ==
Cynthia Clark was born in Dearborn, Michigan, on August 26, 1908. Her parents were Arthur Pierson Clark and Elizabeth Snow Clark. She grew up in Dearborn; Buffalo, New York; and Evanston, Illinois.

Clark attended Northwestern University, earning a bachelor's degree in 1929 and a master's in 1930. She would later earn a Ph.D. in psychology from George Washington University in 1957, and would go on to be a lecturer at American University for three years.

== Early career ==
After graduating from Northwestern, Clark became the director of the Christian education program at St. Luke's Episcopal Church in Evanston. In 1934 she moved to New York City to work at the national headquarters of the Episcopal Church, first as a fieldworker, then as the director of youth work.

She married Theodore Otto Wedel in May 1939; they moved to Washington, D.C., together later that year when he was offered a position as warden of the College of Preachers of the Washington National Cathedral. From 1939 to 1949, she taught religion at the National Cathedral School for Girls. She also served in numerous volunteer roles, including for the American Red Cross and as a member of the national executive board of the Episcopal Women's Auxiliary.

== Later career ==
Wedel served on the board of the National Council of Churches (NCC) from 1955 to 1969. She was the first woman to serve as the associate general secretary for Christian unity, a position on the board responsible for ecumenical relations.

Between 1955 and 1958, she also was the president of United Church Women. Wedel was one of several women from Church Women United appointed by President Kennedy in 1961 to serve on the Presidential Commission on the Status of Women.

Wedel was nominated to become president of the NCC in 1969. When United Church of Christ pastor Albert Cleage decided to run against her, it became the first time the election had been contested. Wedel ignored suggestions she should withdraw and the NCC's 1969 convention was tumultuous, though she received 387 of the 480 votes cast. After her election as the first female president, she worked to direct the publicity aimed at her election towards the issues important to the NCC, including racial issues and relationships with conservative churches. By the late 1960s the Episcopal Church was one of the few Protestant denominations that did not ordain women, but Wedel described that policy as "more objectionable in theory than restrictive in practice." During and after her presidency, she traveled the U.S. preaching and speaking in favor of church unity. She was succeeded by W. Sterling Cary on December 7, 1972.

Wedel was also an active participant in the World Council of Churches (WCC), serving on the WCC committee on the laity from 1961 to 1968. She was elected as one of the six presidents of the WCC in 1975, becoming the only woman to head both organizations. She served in that role until 1983. During her time in that position, she maintained relationships with the leadership of the Roman Catholic Church and the Russian Orthodox Church, and participated in a study exploring the historical basis for ecumenism.

Wedel was involved in other organizations as well, describing herself as "the busiest volunteer in Washington." In the 1970s she was the associate director of the Center for Voluntarism of the Institute for Applied Behavioral Science. She was named the deputy national volunteer coordinator for blood services at the American Red Cross in 1979. She wrote several books, including Employed Women and the Church: Study and Discussion Guide for Church Groups and Citizenship, Our Christian Concern.

== Awards and legacy ==
In 1972 she received the Northwestern Alumni Medal.

She died August 24, 1986, at a retirement community in Alexandria, Virginia. At her death, general secretary of the World Council of Churches Emilio Castro described her as "the first lady of ecumenism," and Bishop John H. Burt said Wedel was "one of the brightest spirits in the ecumenical church of our time".
