= Ben Kamin =

American rabbi (1953–2021)

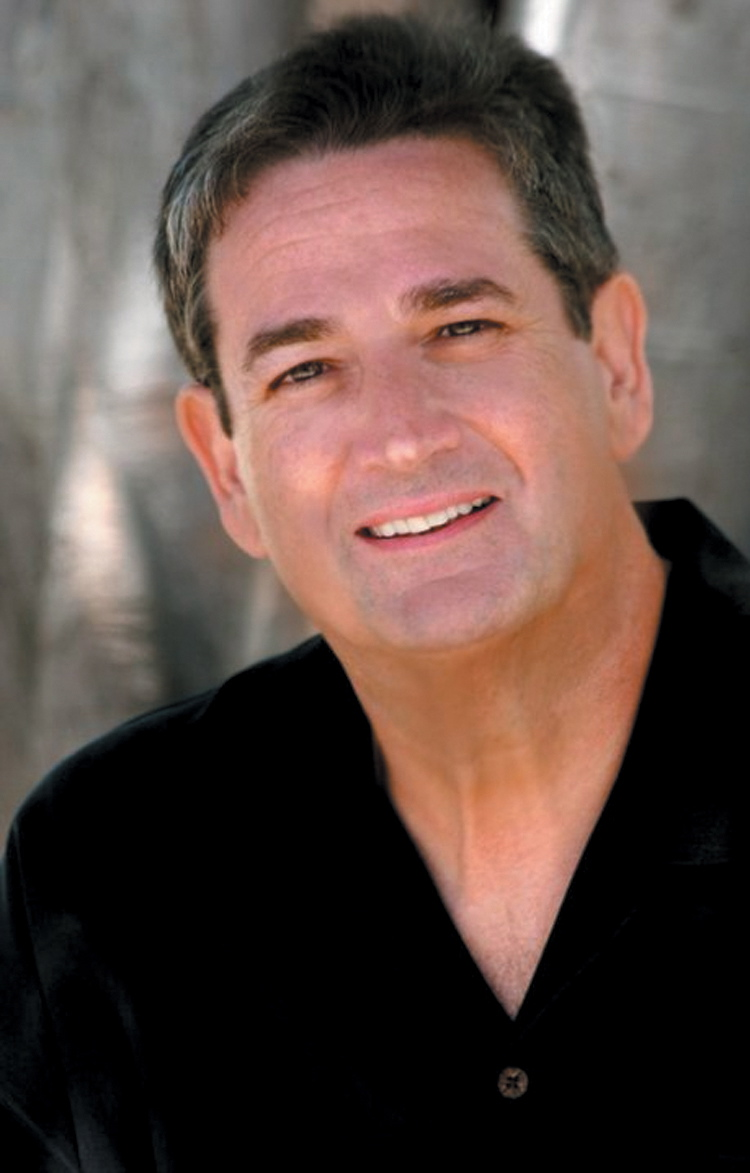
- Rabbi Ben Kamin. (Photo by Beatrice Ring)

Personal life
- Born: Benjamin Alon Kamin; January 11, 1953 Kfar-Saba, Israel
- Died: August 8, 2021 (aged 68) San Diego, California
- Spouse: Cathy Jill Rosen (m. 1975; div. 2003) Audrey Caras (m. 2004; div. 2014)
- Children: 2 (female); with Rosen
- Education: University of Cincinnati; Hebrew Union College; Institute of Jewish Religion
- Occupation: Rabbi (1978–2019; expelled); Author

Religious life
- Religion: Judaism
- Denomination: Reform Judaism
- Synagogue: The Temple Tifereth-Israel
- Position: Senior Rabbi
- Began: 1989
- Ended: 2000 (Contract terminated)
- Other: Founder, Reconciliation: The Synagogue Without Walls (2004–2021)
- Semikhah: 1978

Ben Kamin (January 11, 1953 – August 8, 2021) was a rabbi, teacher, counselor, author and a scholar on Rev. Martin Luther King Jr. He led congregations in Toronto, New York, Cleveland, and San Diego after his ordination in 1978.

Kamin wrote twelve books on human values, and published over 1,000 articles about community life in newspapers around the world. He was quoted in the Ann Landers column and in the Congressional Record. He appeared frequently on radio and television and served on several national boards dealing with community affairs and interfaith relations. The father of two adult children, he held the degree of Doctor of Divinity from Hebrew Union College.

Kamin was elected to the American Society of Journalists and Authors in 2007.

Kamin resigned from the San Diego Rabbinical Association in 2004 after creating an independent agency that serviced interfaith situations called "Reconciliation: The Synagogue Without Walls."

Kamin was suspended from the Central Conference of American Rabbis in 2019, under Section V for sexual boundaries. He resigned during the suspension, which is a violation of the CCAR ethics code, causing automatic expulsion.

== Publications ==
- Stones in the soul: one day in the life of an American rabbi, Macmillan Publishing, 1990; "A sweeping account of the making of a rabbi in America, and, in a sense, an apology for the separate peace that a modern rabbi must make with God if he is to survive at all."
- Raising a thoughtful teenager: a book of answers and values for parents, Dutton, 1996; "The rabbi has not written a chapter-and-verse, throw-the-book-at-them advice book. He presents a gentler but well-grounded alternative."
- Thinking Passover: a rabbi's book of holiday values, Dutton, 1997; "In this book, Kamin "weaves his own Israeli origin and early upbringing and his parents' participation in the struggle for Israel's independence into the biblical Passover story."
- The Spirit Behind the News, Muffin Dog Press, 2009
- Nothing like sunshine: a story in the aftermath of the MLK assassination, Michigan State University Press, 2010; "Through the filter of nearly 40 years of his own life, Rabbi Kamin explores American race relations, the rapid social change of the 1960s, and his efforts to model his own spiritual life after that of King's."
