= Mizpah Congregation =

Reform synagogue in Tennessee, US

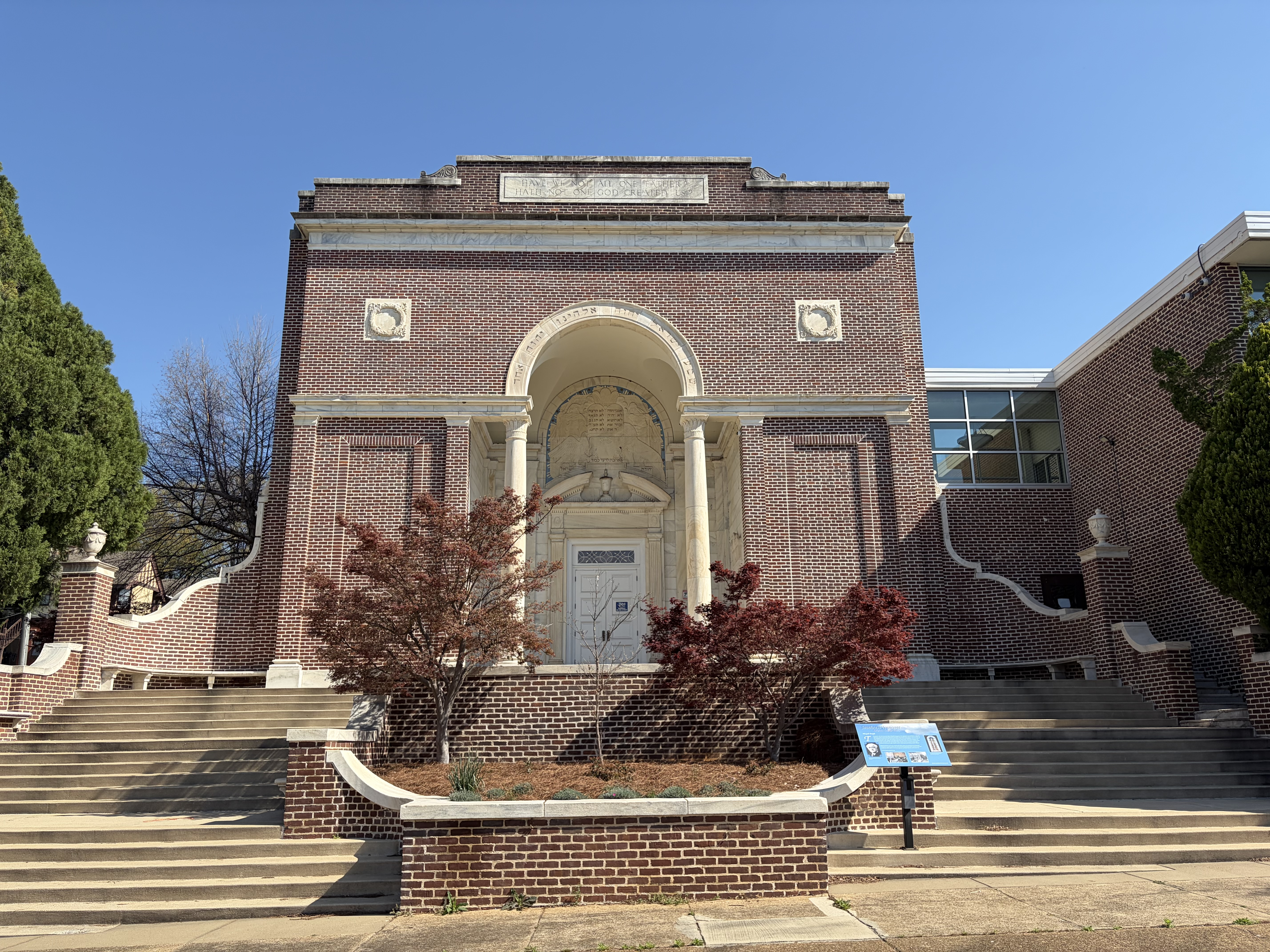
- Mizpah Congregation in 2026

- Location in Tennessee

Religion
- Affiliation: Reform Judaism
- Ecclesiastical or organisational status: Synagogue
- Status: Active

Location
- Location: 923 McCallie Avenue, Chattanooga, Tennessee
- Country: United States
- Coordinates: 35°02′34″N 85°17′32″W

Architecture
- Architects: Colonial Revival; Georgian Revival
- Type: Synagogue
- Established: 1866 (as a congregation); 1867 (Chartered by the State)
- Completed: 1882 (Walnut Street); 1904 (Oak and Lindsay Sts.); 1928 (McCallie Avenue)

Website
- mizpahcongregation.org

The Mizpah congregation is a Reform Jewish synagogue located at 923 McCallie Avenue in Chattanooga, Tennessee, in the United States. Founded in 1866, the congregation has erected synagogues in 1882, 1904, and its current site, in 1928 that was designated in 1979 as a Tennessee Historical Preservation Site.

== History ==
A Jewish settlement in Chattanooga can be traced back to before the US Civil War. However, it wasn't until after the war that the Jewish community was really established. In 1860 German immigrants Fannie Schwartzenberg Bach and Jacob Bach made their home there. The Bach family started holding services in their home six years later, Jacob Bach becoming the congregation's first rabbi, cantor, and ritual slaughterer. That same year 21 young Jewish men organized a group called Chebra Gamilas Chaced, which was changed a year later to the Hebrew Benevolence Association. The group received an official state charter in 1867.

The group then purchased land for Jewish community members on the corner of East Third and Collins Street, for a total of $225. In 1869 the congregation got a new volunteer rabbi, E.K. Fischer, who served in this capacity for two years, opening a Jewish religious day school. In 1871 he stepped down for health reasons.

Dr. Marx Block then took control of the congregation. It was under Block and his wife, Delphine, that the Jewish community in Chattanooga grew. In 1877 the Hebrew Ladies Aid Society was founded with 33 women. The Congregation's first temple was built in 1882 on Walnut Street near fifth. The group adopted the name Mitzpah, which in Hebrew means "overlook", or "lookout", which refers to Lookout Mountain. The t was later dropped, changing the name to Mizpaw.

Twenty-two years later, in 1904 a new synagogue was built, due to the growth of the congregation, on the corner of Lindsay and Oak Street. The new building seated 350 people, and was the congregation's synagogue for twenty-four years. The Congregation received its first ordained rabbi, Moses J. Gries, in 1889 and he served the congregation until 1892. Although the congregation was not associated with the Union of American Hebrew Congregations, it started using the revised edition of the union prayer book in 1899, having previously used Isaac M. Wise Minhag America. In 1928, Adolph Ochs, publisher of The New York Times and a former Chattanoogan involved in Reform Judaism, built the 3rd Mizpah temple. This temple located on McCallie Avenue was designated in 1979 by the Tennessee Preservation Trust, a non-profit historic preservation organization, as a Tennessee Preservation Site.
