= Louis Wolsey =

Jewish-American rabbi (1877–1953)

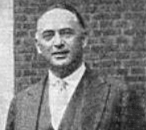
- At the World Union for Progressive Judaism in 1926
- Born: January 8, 1877; Midland, Michigan, US
- Died: March 4, 1953 (aged 76); Germantown, Pennsylvania, US
- Education: Hebrew Union College; University of Cincinnati
- Occupation: Rabbi
- Spouses: Helen Wiener (m. 1912; died 1941) Helen Frank Meyers (m. 1943)
- Children: 2

Louis Wolsey (January 8, 1877 – March 4, 1953) was an American Reform rabbi.

== Life ==
Wolsey was born on January 8, 1877, in Midland, Michigan, the son of William Wolsey and Frances Krueger.

Wolsey attended grammar school in Clare, Michigan, and Chicago, Illinois, as well as Hughes High School in Cincinnati, Ohio. He graduated from Hebrew Union College with a Bachelor of Hebrew in 1894 and from the University of Cincinnati with a Bachelor of Arts in 1899. He was ordained a rabbi by Hebrew Union College in 1899, and in that year became rabbi of Congregation B'nai Israel in Little Rock, Arkansas. In 1907, he became rabbi of Anshe Chesed Congregation in Cleveland, Ohio, the first American-born and trained rabbi to serve there. Under him, the Congregation went from 150 members in 1907 to 1,300 in 1925 and moved to a new building on Euclid Avenue. He favored a more conservative view of Reform Judaism and opposed Classical Reform Judaism, engaging in bitter disputes with Rabbi Moses J. Gries over it, although after Gries' death in 1918 he moved to the mainstream Classical Reform. Interested in Jewish education, he grew the Anshe Chesed Sunday School from 135 students in 1908 to 650 in 1916 and supported Cleveland Hebrew Schools. He became rabbi of Congregation Rodeph Shalom in Philadelphia, Pennsylvania, in 1925, serving as rabbi there until his retirement in 1947.

Wolsey took post-graduate courses at the University of Chicago, Western Reserve University, and the University of Pennsylvania. He received an honorary D.D. degree from Hebrew Union College in 1939. While living in Little Rock, he was a member of the board of education from 1906 to 1907 and chaplain general of the Arkansas State Guard in 1906. In Cleveland, he was a member of the Charter Commission in 1920 and president of the Cleveland Society of Sociology from 1922 to 1923. When he was in Philadelphia, he was chairman of the Mayor's Vice and Crime Commission in 1937 and recommended the state of Pennsylvania reform the parole system. He served as president of the Hebrew Union College Alumni Association from 1913 to 1914, president of the Central Conference of American Rabbis (CCAR) from 1925 to 1927, chancellor of the Jewish Chautauqua Society from 1925 to 1938, a charter member of the World Union for Progressive Judaism, chairman of the CCAR Committee on the Union Hymmal (which published a revision in 1936), and a co-founder of the Leo N. Levi Memorial Hospital in Hot Springs, Arkansas.

Wolsey was relatively favorable to non-political aspects of Zionism when he was in Cleveland, but by 1942 he was part of a group of rabbis who opposed the CCAR's resolution for the establishment of a Palestinian Jewish military unit. He led this dissident group through several conferences that culminated in the formation of the American Council for Judaism, which he became vice-president of. He resigned as vice-president in 1946 to protest its opposition towards unrestricted Jewish immigration to Palestine. He resigned from the Council itself in 1948, finding it irreligious and anti-humanitarian in the face of Jewish refugees following the Holocaust and demanded that the Council be dissolved. He also believed the Zionist movement should be dissolved into a larger world Jewry for the creation of a Jewish life and culture in Israel.

In 1912, Wolsey married Helen Wiener. Their children were Allon L. and Jonathan L. In 1943, he married his second wife, Helen Frank Meyers. In 1941, his first wife Helen and son Jonathan committed suicide together as part of a suicide pact.

Wolsey died at his home in the Mayfair House in Germantown from a long illness on March 4, 1953. His funeral service was held at Rodeph Shalom, and he was buried in Mt. Sinai Cemetery.
