= Finis Farr =

American author and biographer

- Born: Finis Farr; December 31, 1904; Lebanon, Tennessee
- Died: January 3, 1982 (aged 77); Portland, Maine
- Occupations: Writer, biographer
- Writing career
- Genre: Biography
- Notable work: Margaret Mitchell of Atlanta (1976)

Finis Farr (December 31, 1904 – January 3, 1982) was an American writer and biographer. In addition to books, his work appeared in newspapers, magazines, radio programs, television programs, and films. He worked for the Central Intelligence Agency in the 1950s.

== Life and career ==
The son of Rev. Dr. Finis K. Farr and his wife Ethel Riley Farr, Finis Farr was born in Lebanon, Tennessee. He was raised in Cincinnati, Ohio; having moved there with his family in 1910. He attended Hughes High School in Cincinnati before attending Princeton University. He graduated from Princeton in 1926.

After college, Farr initially worked as a journalist for the Cincinnati Post. He worked for several newspapers in Ohio and New York state before joining the staff of NBC in New York City in the late 1920s. At NBC he worked as a writer for radio; writing several radio dramas for company and working as a writer and producer for The March of Time. He also was a main writer for the program Mr. District Attorney.

In the late 1930 Farr was employed as a contributing editor to Time magazine. He abandoned his writing career to serve in the United States Army during World War II. He was awarded the Bronze Star Medal for his war service. After the war he worked in the Central Intelligence Agency; leaving his position at the CIA in 1955. In 1959 he resumed writing full time, and was principally active as a writer of biographies thereafter. He also contributed articles to magazines like American Heritage, Sports Illustrated, and The Saturday Evening Post.

Farr was a longtime resident of Ridgewood, New Jersey prior to retiring to Portland, Maine in 1978. He died in Portland on January 3, 1982.

== Works ==
- Frank Lloyd Wright (1961), biography of an architect Frank Lloyd Wright (Charles Scribner's Sons)
- Black Champion: The Life and Times of Jack Jackson (1964), biography of the boxer Jack Johnson
- The Elephant Valley (1967)
- FDR (1972), biography of Franklin D. Roosevelt (Arlington House)
- O'Hara: A Biography (1973), biography of John O'Hara (Little, Brown and Company)
- Chicago: A Personal History of America's Most American City (1973) (Arlington House)
- Fair enough: The life of Westbrook Pegler (1975), biography of Westbrook Pegler (Artington House)
- Margaret Mitchell of Atlanta: the author of Gone With the Wind (1976), biography of Margaret Mitchell (Avon)
- Richenbacker's Luck: An American Life (1979), biography of Eddie Rickenbacker
