= Jane Corner Young =

American classical composer

Jane Corner Young (March 25, 1915 – March 9, 2001) was an American composer, music therapist, and pianist. She was born in Athens, Ohio, and graduated with a Bachelor of Music degree from Ohio University in 1936. She completed a master of music degree in piano and composition in 1953 at the Cleveland Institute of Music. Young studied piano with Beryl Rubinstein and Arthur Loesser; composition with Marcel Dick; and Dalcroze eurythmics with Elsa Findlay and Ann Lombardo.

Young taught privately and in public schools for over 27 years, and was a faculty member at the Cleveland Institute of Music. She chaired the Cleveland Composers' Guild when it was formed in 1957, and also served as the director of music therapy at Hawthornden State Hospital (today known as Northcoast Behavioral Healthcare) in Northfield, Ohio.

Young's awards include:

- Ohio University Music Fellowship (1942)
- Cleveland Institute Alumni Award (in composition; 1961)
- Mu Phi Epsilon (winner, composition contest; 1971)

Young's compositions include:

== Chamber ==
- Essences (for two violins; won 1961 Cleveland Institute Alumni Award)

== Piano ==
- Andante Espressivo
- Caprice (1976)
- Children's Picture Pieces
- Dramatic Soliloquy (1961)
- First Journey
- Five Duets for Matched Students
- Five Tone Thoughts and Summary (won 1971 Mu Phi Epsilon Composition Contest)
- Four Recital Pieces (The Chase; Patterns; Shadows; Waltz)
- I Won't Go
- Piano Gambol
- Schumanniana (1974)
- Two Humorous PIeces (Going Away; March for Clowns)
- Two Short Studies (Counting; Two Melodies)
- Two Study Pieces (Half Steps; Whole Steps)
- Variations on an American Sea Shanty
- Yesterday/Today

== Vocal ==
- Blues Art Song: Who There to Know
- Captive (with L. Kenney)
- Fantasy (with L. Kenney)
- How I Like a Wild Tame Bird (with piano)
- (The) Story of Fay (with bassoon, flute, oboe, piano, trumpet, violin and zither)
- Such is Her Love (with piano)
- Untidy Sun (with L. Kenney)
- We People Song Cycle (with cello and piano)
