= Loretta C. Manggrum =

American pianist and music educator

Loretta Cessor Manggrum
- Born: Loretta Catherine Cessor; July 28, 1896; Gallipolis, Ohio
- Died: May 11, 1992 (aged 95); Cincinnati, Ohio
- Other name: L.C. Manggrum
- Occupations: composer, educator
- Spouse: William Langston Manggrum (m. 1918)
- Children: 3

Loretta Cessor Manggrum (July 28, 1896 – May 11, 1992), also known as L.C. Manggrum, was an American pianist, music educator, and composer of sacred music. In particular, she is known for her cantatas and other choral works. She was the first African American to earn a degree from the Cincinnati Conservatory of Music, where she earned a master's degree in Music in 1953. Some of her archives, including, manuscripts, scores, and correspondence, is in the Library of Congress and in the Amistad Research Center at Tulane University.

== Early life ==
Loretta Cessor was born in Gallipolis, Ohio, to John Cessor and Lillian Jane Fitch. Cessor's great-great-grandmother was enslaved, and Cessor herself came from a mixed line of African and Irish ancestry. She later remembered, "It's true that some in both my husband's family and mine ‘crossed over’ to live as whites in their communities. ... My great-great-great-grandmother on my mother's side bore three children by an Irishman. My great-grandmother also had three sons by her white master."

Cessor's mother was a teacher and musician who played guitar and piano, and Cessor quickly became skilled at piano. As a child, she played piano at church. By age 15, she was supporting the family by playing in orchestras in nearby Huntington, West Virginia, earning up to $35 a week playing at bars and parties.

She became engaged to William Langston Manggrum at age 16, but postponed the wedding when Cessor's mother fell ill. Cessor dropped out of high school to care for her mother.

In 1918, she married William in Cabell County, West Virginia, and the couple moved to Milwaukee. Soon after, they moved to Pittsburgh, where William studied pharmacy. Cessor continued to help support her family, which now included several small children, by teaching piano.

In 1926, Manggrum and her family moved to Cincinnati, Ohio. Manggrum earned some money at a moving picture house, where she played to accompany the silent films, sometimes from the score and sometimes improvising her own accompaniment. By the mid-1930s they had opened a drugstore where the whole family worked.

== Education ==
By the late 1940s, Manggrum's children were older and the family drugstore was doing well. In 1945, she was finally able to complete her high school diploma at the age of 49, graduating from Hughes High School in Cincinnati. Responding to what she called “an inner voice,” she continued her education by spending her summers at various music programs, including at Fisk University, Capital University, and the Chicago Conservatory.

When Manggrum applied for a summer program at Ohio State University, the dean of the music school, Eugene John Weigel, insisted she enroll for a degree-level course instead. Manggrum earned her bachelor of music degree from the university in 1951.

Manggrum then became the first African American to enroll at the Cincinnati Conservatory of Music and the first to earn a degree there, graduating in 1953 at the age of 57 with a master of music. Manggrum later said that she applied to the Conservatory on a dare, as they had previously denied her daughter entrance there.

== Later career ==
In her lifetime, Manggrum published a number of works, including seven cantatas now in the Library of Congress. Choral works such as the anthem "A Great, Great King", showcase Manggrum's use of fugue in her "deceptively simple" compositions. Her 90-minute cantata Watch premiered in 1958 and has been performed across the country; Manggrum once called it ”the culmination of all my life's work in music.”

In addition to her composition work, she spent a decade teaching music for Cincinnati Public Schools. She also served as choir director and organist for various Cincinnati churches, including Union Baptist Church, Brown Chapel AME, and Gaines United Methodist Church.

At the age of 80, Manggrum returned to the Cincinnati Conservatory of Music for doctoral studies, saying she wanted to "finish work on my stalled cantata, but only incidentally to work toward a PhD."

Manggrum died in May 1992, survived by one of her three children. She is buried next to her husband in the Spring Hill Cemetery in Huntington, West Virginia.

== Recognition & legacy ==
The Cincinnati Enquirer named Manggrum one of their Women of the Year in 1978.

In the 1980s, she was invited to give her works to the Library of Congress, where the Loretta Manggrum Collection "documents the career of this African American woman, who balanced family, education, and a music career at a time when the nation's social climate seriously impeded the ability of African American women to achieve the kind of success and recognition that Manggrum earned."

One year later, in 1986, the University of Cincinnati conferred an honorary doctorate of music upon Manggrum, recognizing her contributions to the field of music and to the city of Cincinnati.

In 2010, Eric Oliver founded the Loretta C. Manggrum Chorale in Cincinnati, to honor his mentor and ensure that the music of Manggrum and other African American composers continues to be performed.
