= David Rubinstein (social historian) =

American social historian (1932–2019)

- Born: 7 August 1932; Cleveland, Ohio, U.S.
- Died: 19 August 2019 (aged 87): American; British (from 1964)
- Education: London School of Economics
- Political party: Labour
- Spouses: Shirley Livingstone (m. 1956, divorced) Ann Holt (m. 1974)
- Children: 3

David Rubinstein (7 August 1932 – 19 August 2019) was an American-born British social historian and political activist.

== Biography ==
Rubinstein was born of Jewish parentage in Cleveland Heights, Ohio, US. His father Beryl Rubinstein was a musician.

To escape McCarthyism and as inspired by a trip he took around Europe, Rubinstein moved to England in 1952 to pursue a PhD at London School of Economics, where he completed a doctoral thesis on The decline of the Liberal Party 1880–1900 under the supervision of Richard Greaves. After graduating, Rubinstein joined the Labour Party, became a naturalised British citizen in 1964, and began teaching social history the University of Hull the following year. He also joined The Ramblers and was a campaigner for Palestinian rights and better transport.

In 1956, Rubinstein married Shirley Livingstone, with whom he had three children. They later divorced, and Rubenstein remarried writer and researcher Ann Holt in 1974. Rubinstein and Holt later became members of the Religious Society of Friends.

After leaving Hull in 1988, Rubinstein, a Francophile, taught at French universities in Tours, Angers, and Boulogne. Back in England, he worked in local government in Tower Hamlets and Maidstone as a council and Labour Party adviser. Rubenstein and Holt retired to York in 1997, where he was an honorary fellow of the University of York. He continued to write about Quakers, York, and the history of the Labour Party. He traveled frequently and refused to own a car, relying solely on public transport and protesting rural service cuts.

He specialized in the 19th and 20th centuries and wrote approximately 20 books.

He died in 2019.

== Publications ==
A selection of Rubinstein's work:

- 1969: The Evolution of the Comprehensive School, 1926-1966 (Authored with Brian Simon. London: Routledge) ISBN 0-7100-6357-1
- 1969: Leisure Transport and the Countryside (Authored with Colin Speakman. London: Fabian Society) ISBN 0-7163-1277-8
- 1969: School Attendance in London, 1870-1904: A Social History (New York: A.M. Kelley) ISBN 0-678-08000-3
- 1970: Education for Democracy (Edited with Colin Stoneman. New York: Penguin) ISBN 0-14-080199-5
- 1972: Psychotherapy of Schizophrenia (Authored with Yrjo O. Alanen)
- 1972: The Wold's Way
- 1973: People for the People: Radical Ideas & Personalities in British Social History (London: Ithaca Press) ISBN 0-903729-02-4
- 1974: Victorian Homes (North Pomfret, VT: David & Charles) ISBN 0-7153-6765-X
- 1980: Education and Equality
- 1981: Marx and Wittgenstein: Social Praxis and Social Explanation
- 1986: Before the Suffragettes: Women's Emancipation in the 1890s (Brighton, Sussex, UK: Harvester) ISBN 0-7108-1051-2
- 1991: A Different World for Women: The Life of Millicent Garrett Fawcett (New York: Harvester Wheatsheaf) ISBN 0-7108-1104-7
- 1999: But He'll Remember: An Autobiography. William Sessions Limited
- 1999: York Friends and the Great War (York, UK: Borthwick Institute of Historical Research)
- 2000: Culture, Structure and Agency: Toward a Truly Multidimensional Sociology
- 2005: The Labour Party and British Society, 1880–2005 (Brighton, UK: Sussex Academic Press) ISBN 1-84519-055-6
- 2006: An Inquiry into the Philosophical Foundations of the Human Sciences (Authored with Alfred Claassen. San Francisco State University Series in Philosophy)
- 2009: The Backhouse Quaker Family of York Nurserymen: Including James Backhouse, 1794-1869, Botanist and Quaker Missionary
- 2009: The Nature of the World: The Yorkshire Philosophical Society, 1822-2000 (York, UK: Quacks) ISBN 1-904446-18-3
