= Temple Shalom (Wheeling, West Virginia) =

Reform synagogue in West Virginia, US

- Location in West Virginia

Religion
- Affiliation: Reform Judaism
- Ecclesiastical or organizational status: Synagogue
- Leadership: Lay led
- Status: Active

Location
- Location: 23 Bethany Pike, Wheeling, West Virginia
- Interactive map of Temple Shalom
- Coordinates: 40°4′51″N 80°41′30″W

Architecture
- Established: 1849 (earlier congregation); 1974 (merged congregation)
- Completed: 1892 (Eoff Street); 1957 (Bethany Pike)

Website
- wvtempleshalom.org

Temple Shalom is a synagogue of Reform Judaism at 23 Bethany Pike, Wheeling, West Virginia, in the United States. The congregation dates from 1849. The building was completed in 1957 as the Woodside Temple.

== History ==
Temple Shalom is the result of the merger of several smaller congregations with Congregation L'Shem Shomayim (Hebrew, meaning "For the sake of Heaven") which was founded in 1849 (Note: At the time, West Virginia, commonly called Trans-Allegheny Virginia, had not been formed as a state, nor joined the Union. and it was considered part of The Commonwealth of Virginia. Following the 1861 Wheeling Convention, West Virginia was officially admitted as a U.S. state on June 20, 1863.) by Jews who had immigrated from German-speaking Central European nations. It is the oldest Jewish congregation in West Virginia.

Abba Hillel Silver served as its rabbi for two years (1915–1917), immediately after his graduation and ordination at the Hebrew Union College in Cincinnati.

In April 1892, the congregation dedicated an elaborate Moorish Revival synagogue on Eoff Street, known as the Eoff Street Temple. The building featured a dome, keyhole door and elaborate keyhole windows. This building was used until 1957 when the Woodsdale Temple was built on Bethany Pike. In 1974 the Woodsdale Temple (Reform) and the Synagogue of Israel (Conservative) merged to form Temple Shalom. In 1986 Agudas Achim Congregation of nearby Bellaire, Ohio closed and its members joined Temple Shalom. The Eoff Street synagogue was later demolished.
