= Maltz Performing Arts Center =

Historic Reform Jewish synagogue and arts center, in Cleveland, Ohio, US

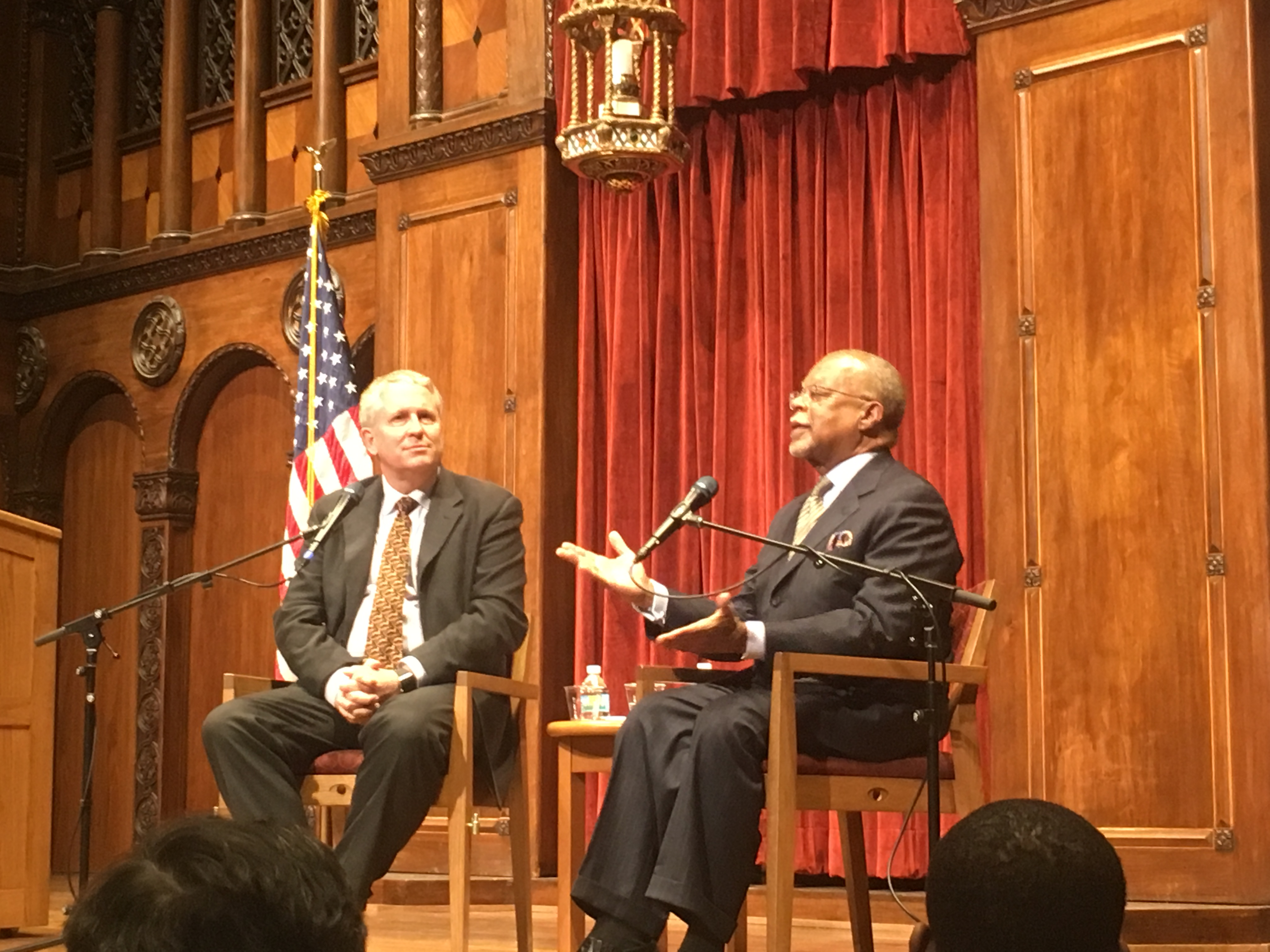
- Interior of the building, in 2017
- Interactive map of Maltz Performing Arts Center
- Full name: Milton and Tamar Maltz Performing Arts Center
- Former names: The University Temple; The Silver Sanctuary
- Address: 1855 Ansel Road, Cleveland, Ohio 44106; United States
- Coordinates: 41°30′29″N 81°36′58″W
- Owner: Tifereth-Israel congregation
- Capacity: 1,200 people
- Type: Performing arts center
- Events: Theatre, music, seminars

Construction
- Years active: since 2010

Tenant
- Case Western Reserve University

Website
- case.edu/maltzcenter

Temple–Tifereth Israel Silver Sanctuary
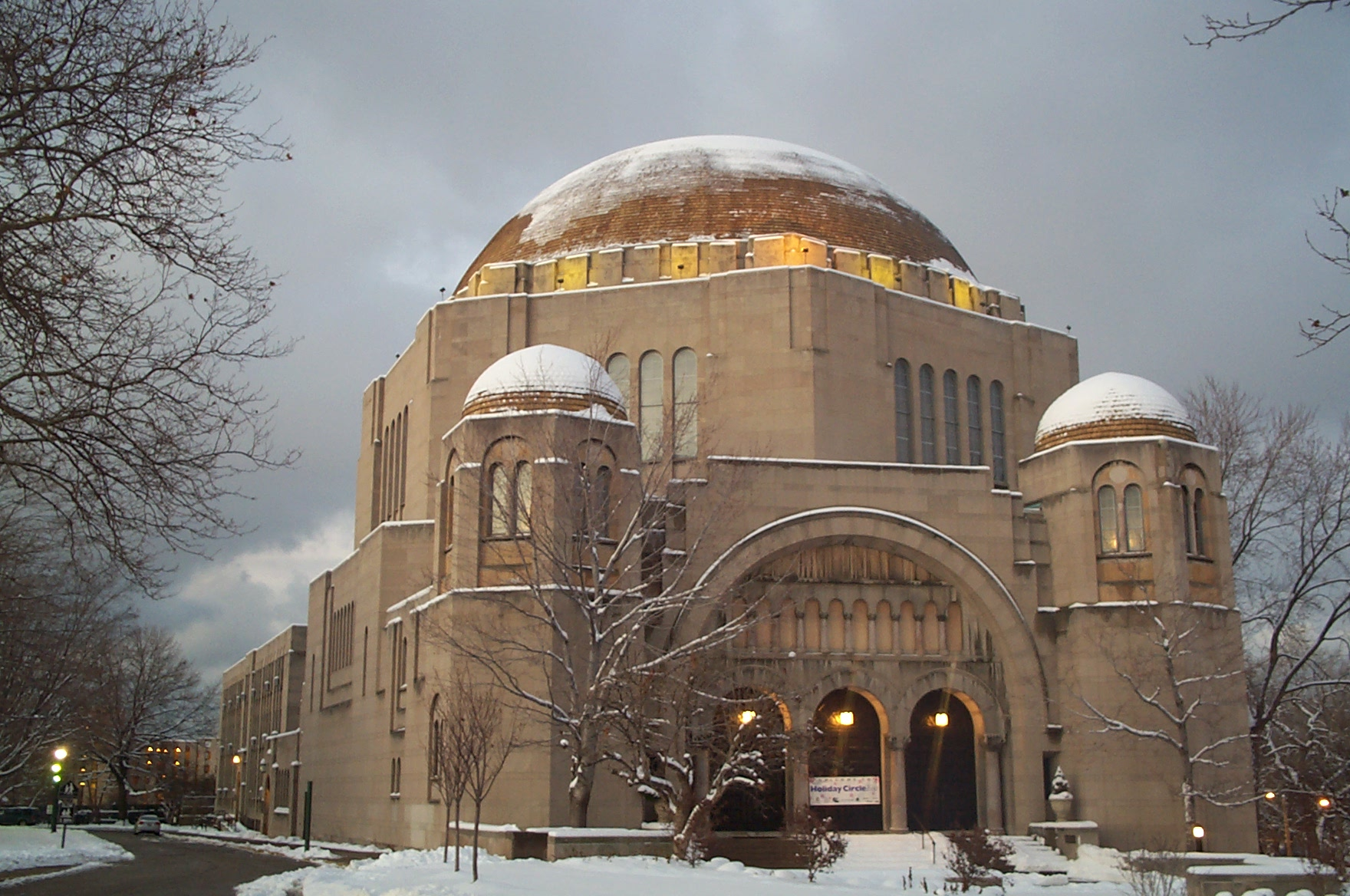
- The Silver Sanctuary building in winter 2005

- Location of the synagogue in Cleveland, Ohio

Religion
- Affiliation: Reform Judaism
- Ecclesiastical or organisational status: Synagogue
- Ownership: Tifereth-Israel congregation
- Status: Active

Location
- Coordinates: 41°30′29″N 81°36′58″W

Architecture
- Architect: Charles R. Greco
- Type: Synagogue architecture
- Style: Byzantine Revival; Romanesque Revival
- General contractor: John Gill & Sons
- Completed: 1924
- Construction cost: $1.5 million

Specifications
- Capacity: 1,227 (main floor); 659 (mezzanine)
- Dome: Three
- Dome height (outer): 85 feet (26 m)
- Dome dia. (outer): 90 feet (27 m)
- Materials: Indiana limestone, marble, ceramic tiles
- The University Temple
- U.S. National Register of Historic Places
- NRHP reference No.: 74001455
- Added to NRHP: August 30, 1974

The Maltz Performing Arts Center, officially the Milton and Tamar Maltz Performing Arts Center, is a 1200-seat historic arts and religious venue on the campus of Case Western Reserve University, located at 1855 Ansel Road, in Cleveland, Ohio, in the United States. The center is contained within the Temple–Tifereth Israel synagogue building, located at Silver Park, on the border between the neighborhoods of Hough and University Circle.

The converted Reform Jewish synagogue, known as The University Temple, The Temple, or the Silver Sanctuary, serves as the main performance venue of the Case Western Reserve music department and holds campus special events. Silver Hall is used by the local Jewish congregation for annual religious and special events.

== 1924 temple building ==
Sited on a triangular block, excavation for the new structure began on December 4, 1922; and on May 13, 1923, the cornerstone was laid. The Temple was designed by architect Charles R. Greco in a mix of Byzantine Revival and Romanesque Revival styles. Built from Indiana limestone and marble, the heptagonal sanctuary is topped by a yellow-tiled 90-foot (27 m) dome, with two smaller domes flanking the entrance. Completed in 1924 at a cost of $1.5 million, The Temple was dedicated over the High Holy Days on September 19–21. The sanctuary contains three notable stained glass windows by Arthur Szyk that depict Gideon, Samson and Judah Maccabee. A large W. W. Kimball pipe organ was built for the opening, with specifications designed by temple organist Carleton H. Bullis.

The Temple served as the home synagogue for the Tifereth-Israel congregation until 1963.

The congregation was served by rabbis Abba Hillel Silver, from 1917 until his death in 1963, and by his son, Daniel Jeremy Silver, from 1963 until his death in 1989. In 1990, the congregation rededicated the sanctuary as the Silver Sanctuary, in their honor.

The Temple was added to the National Register of Historic Places on August 30, 1974.

== 1963 branch synagogue building ==
In 1963, a branch synagogue, The Temple Tifereth-Israel, was established in suburban Beachwood, which is now the main place of worship. The congregation now known as The Temple - Tifereth Israel owns the 1924 building, used on the High Holy Days as well as for life cycle events and meetings.

== Case Western Reserve University partnership ==
In March 2010, Case Western Reserve University and The Temple Tifereth-Israel announced a historic partnership to create the Milton and Tamar Maltz Performing Arts Center, which was led by a donation of $12 million from the Maltz Family Foundation of the Jewish Community Federation of Cleveland. The university estimated that the total renovation of the building required $25.6 million, with an additional $7 million needed for construction of a pedestrian bridge/walkway to connect the building to the university campus. The multi-phased project, carried out by architectural firm DLR Group, allowed the sanctuary to accommodate music performances, lectures, as well as a place of worship and expanded the facility for the university’s theater and dance departments. The renovations and conversions were completed in 2015.

A major construction project was completed in 2021 that added additional performing arts spaces to the Temple. Two theaters, scenic and costume shops, classrooms, storage, and the offices of the CWRU Department of Theater, which manages operations of the additional space were part of the project.

== Temple Museum of Religious Art ==
The synagogue building is one of three gallery locations for the Temple Museum of Religious Art, operated by Temple-Tifereth Israel. Other locations include the Temple-Tifereth Israel Gallery at the Maltz Museum of Jewish Heritage and Temple Tifereth-Israel in Beachwood. The museum was founded in 1950 by Rabbi Abba Hillel Silver as part of the 100th anniversary celebration for The Temple-Tifereth Israel.
