= Balfour Brickner =

American rabbi (1926–2005)

Personal life
- Born: November 18, 1926 Cleveland, Ohio, U.S.
- Died: August 29, 2005 (aged 78) New York City, New York, U.S.
- Spouse: Barbara Michaels Brickner; Doris Gottlieb Brickner
- Education: University of Cincinnati

Religious life
- Religion: Judaism
- Denomination: Reform

Jewish leader
- Semikhah: Hebrew Union College-Jewish Institute of Religion

Balfour Brickner (November 18, 1926 – August 29, 2005), a leading rabbi in the Reform Judaism movement, was rabbi emeritus of the Stephen Wise Free Synagogue in Manhattan when he died.

Brickner was a longtime political activist who was involved in the civil rights struggle (he was arrested at the Monson Motor Lodge protests in St. Augustine, Florida on June 18, 1964, as part of the largest mass arrest of rabbis in American history, having gone there at the urging of Martin Luther King Jr.), the Vietnam antiwar movement (traveling to Paris with an interfaith peace group to meet with Viet Cong leaders) and efforts supporting a woman's right to choose abortion.

He lived in Fort Lee, New Jersey and Stockbridge, Massachusetts.

Brickner was born in Cleveland, Ohio, where his father, Rabbi Barnett R. Brickner, led Congregation Anshe Chesed (Fairmount Temple), one of the country's largest Reform congregations. Brickner served in the United States Navy during World War II. He graduated from the University of Cincinnati in 1948, with a bachelor's degree in philosophy. In 1952, he received his rabbinic ordination from the Hebrew Union College-Jewish Institute of Religion in Cincinnati.

A year after he was ordained, he moved to Washington, D.C., where he founded Temple Sinai. He served there until 1961, when he moved to New York City for a position in the national headquarters of the Union of American Hebrew Congregations (now known as the Union for Reform Judaism. Though described as "a passionate Zionist," he openly aired his criticism of Israeli policies.

Brickner served on the boards of the National Association for the Repeal of Abortion Laws, the National Abortion and Reproductive Rights Action League and the Planned Parenthood Federation of America. He was selected by New York magazine as one of its 2003 list of the 50 sexiest New Yorkers, noting that he had "the looks of a rake (wavy silver mane, chiseled jaw) and the soul of a mensch."

Brickner's book Finding God in the Garden (Little, Brown and Company) was published by in 2002.

On the occasion of the death of Rabbi Balfour Brickner, Dr. Eugene Fisher, associate director of the U.S. Bishops' Committee for Ecumenical and Interreligious Affairs, wrote that he was “one of the great leaders of Reform Judaism and one of the greatest American religious leaders of the second half of the twentieth century.”
