= Arthur Lelyveld =

Arthur J. Lelyveld
- Born: February 6, 1913; Manhattan, New York, U.S.
- Died: April 15, 1996 (aged 83); Beachwood, Ohio, U.S.
- Resting place: Cleveland Heights, Ohio, U.S.
- Education: Hebrew Union College
- Occupations: Rabbi, activist
- Spouses: Toby Bookholtz; Teela Stovsky

Rabbi Arthur J. Lelyveld (February 6, 1913 – April 15, 1996) was a rabbi within the movement of Reform Judaism and activist.

== Early life and education ==
Lelyveld was born in Manhattan on Feb. 6, 1913. He graduated from Columbia College in 1933. At Columbia, he was the first Jewish editor of the Columbia Daily Spectator, leader of the glee club, and competed on the wrestling team. In 1939, he graduated from the Hebrew Union College in Cincinnati, Ohio.

== Career ==
After marrying Toby Bookholtz, an actress and scholar of Shakespeare, Lelyveld moved to Omaha, Nebraska in 1941, where he led Temple Israel. In 1944, he then moved to New York, where he took on organizational rabbinic roles, including heading up the national Hillel organization. He served as a rabbi in Cincinnati for a time. He also served as president of the Zionist Organization of America from 1944.

From 1958 until 1986, Lelyveld served as rabbi of Fairmount Temple in the Cleveland suburb of Beachwood, Ohio. From 1966 to 1972, he was president of the American Jewish Congress, a 50,000-member organization. He served as president of the Central Conference of American Rabbis, and of the Synagogue Council of America.

Lelyveld retired from the rabbinate in 1986. As senior rabbi emeritus, he served as a lecturer in Jewish thought at John Carroll University.

Rabbi Lelyveld was diagnosed with a brain tumor, and died at the Montefiore Home in Beachwood, Ohio, on April 15, 1996. His funeral at Fairmount Temple was attende by more than 1,200 people. Presidents Jimmy Carter and Bill Clinton sent condolences. He was interred at Mayfield Cemetery in Cleveland Heights, Ohio.

== Activism ==
During the Second World War Lelyveld was a pacifist and conscientious objector, though he did propose sending a Jewish relief force to Europe. He headed the Jewish Peace Fellowship, a coalition, formed in 1941, of a number of groups of Jewish antiwar activists.

Lelyveld voiced his support for the recognition of the State of Israel and was the executive director for the Committee on Unity for Palestine in 1946, lobbying Harry S Truman to that end. He was also active in attempts to create harmonious relations between Jews and blacks in the United States. While he was in Omaha, he was a member of the local Urban League. He was also active in the registration of black voters in the South during the 1960s. During the Freedom Summer of 1964 he suffered a concussion after he was beaten with a tire iron by segregationists in Hattiesburg, Mississippi.

== Family ==
Lelyveld had five children. His son Joseph Lelyveld was the executive editor of The New York Times, and won a Pulitzer Prize for journalism. His son David Lelyveld was a professor of history at William Paterson University; he retired in 2012. Another son, Michael S. Lelyveld consults on Russian and Caspian energy. His daughter, Robin Lelyveld, is a psychologist. Lelyveld's youngest son, Benjamin, died in 1988 at the age of 30.

His second marriage, to Teela Stovsky, lasted 35 years.

== Bibliography ==
- A study of the Tanya of Rabbi Shneur Zalman of Ladi. AJ Lelyveld, Hebrew Union College, 1939.
- The Virtues of Uncertainty, A Lelyveld, Journal of Higher Education, 1950.
- Religion in Higher Education, A Lelyveld, Journal of Higher Education, 1952.
- A Collection of Chapel Sermons, A Lelyveld, Journal of Higher Education, 1956.
- Atheism Is Dead: A Jewish Response to Radical Theology, A Lelyveld, The World Publishing Company, 1968.
- Punishment: For and against, A Lelyveld, New York: Hart, 1971.
- The Virtues of Uncertainty: The Role of the University in Training for Social Welfare, A Lelyveld, Journal of Higher Education, 1979.
- The unity of the contraries: paradox as a characteristic of normative Jewish thought, AJ Lelyveld, Syracuse University, 1984.
- The Steadfast Stream: An Introduction to Jewish Social Values, A Lelyveld, The Pilgrim Press, 1995.
