= Moses J. Gries =

American rabbi (1868–1918)

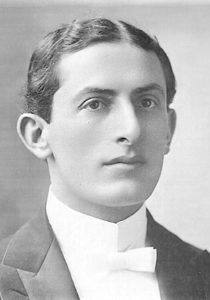

Moses J. Gries (January 25, 1868 – October 30, 1918) was an American rabbi who mostly ministered in Cleveland, Ohio.

== Life ==
Gries was born on January 25, 1868, in Newark, New Jersey, the son of Jacob Gries and Katherine Frances Holzer. His father died when he was three, his mother when he was seven. He received a secular education in Newark and a religious education from Rabbi Joseph Leucht and Rabbi Joseph Hahn.

Gries finished his grammar school course at that age, the youngest graduate in Newark's history. He spent the next two years studying in New York City, and when he was thirteen he was successfully accepted into Hebrew Union College. He had been studying to be a rabbi since he was eleven, and he attended the college for eight years. From 1881 to 1885, he was also studying at Hughes High School, and from 1885 to 1889 he studied at the University of Cincinnati. When he was twenty-one, he graduated from the university with a Bachelor of Letters degree and was ordained a rabbi by Hebrew Union College.

Gries was initially a rabbi of the Mizpah Congregation in Chattanooga, Tennessee, serving as rabbi there from 1889 to 1892. He then served as rabbi of Temple Tifereth-Israel in Cleveland, Ohio, from 1892 to 1917. Under his leadership, the Temple became one of America's leading congregations. An advocate of a liberal Reform Judaism, his congregation was one of the first to let women serve on the board of trustees, Shabbat services were held on Sunday, and the Torah wasn't read from the Torah scroll. He conceived of the Temple as not just for worship and religious instruction, but as a larger center for the community. This led his congregation to be one of the first, if not the first, to advocate and conduct "the open temple." A charter member of the Central Conference of American Rabbis, he served as assistant secretary from 1893 to 1894, treasurer from 1909 to 1911, vice-president from 1911 to 1913, and president from 1913 to 1915. He also wrote a history of Cleveland Jews called The Jewish Community of Cleveland in 1910.

Gries was the first native-born Hebrew Union College-educated rabbi in Cleveland. Believing Reform Judaism should be Americanized, he discarded German, removed Hebrew from the religious school's curriculum, replaced Hebrew in services with English, adopted the Union Prayer Book, and created various congregational groups, including the Temple Women's Association, the Temple Library, the Temple Alumni Association, the Educational League, the Temple Orchestra, and the Temple Society. Politically progressive and active in religious affairs, he was a founder of the Citizens League of Cleveland, the Council Educational Alliance in 1899, and the Federation of Jewish Charities in 1903. He protested pogroms and urged aid for Eastern European Jewish immigrants, but he was removed from them and denounced Zionism. He resigned as rabbi for health reasons in 1917.

Gries was president of the Alumni Association of Hebrew Union College, a member of the Hebrew Union College board of governors, and an executive committee member of the American Jewish Relief Committee. In 1897, he married Frances "Fannie" Hays, daughter of Kaufman Hays. Their children were Robert and Lincoln.

Gries died at the East Fifty-fifth Street Hospital following an attack of intestinal trouble on October 30, 1918. Rabbi Abba Hillel Silver, his successor as rabbi, officiated his funeral at Mayfield Cemetery, where he was buried.
