= Temple Tifereth-Israel =

Reform Jewish synagogue in Beachwood, Ohio, US

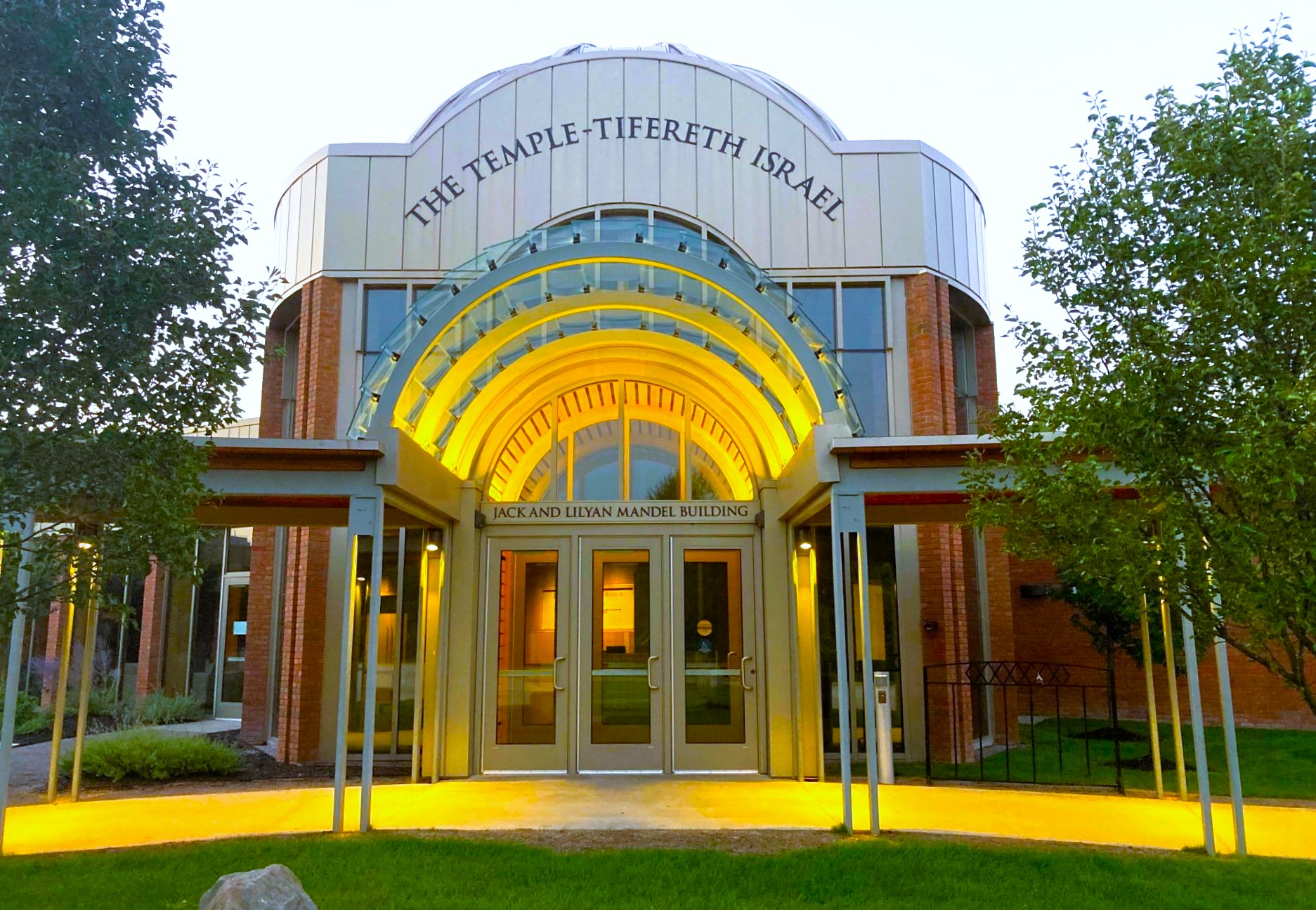

- Location in Cleveland's eastern suburbs

Religion
- Affiliation: Reform Judaism
- Ecclesiastical or organizational status: Synagogue
- Leadership: Rabbi Jonathan Cohen; Rabbi Roger C. Klein; Rabbi Yael Dadoun; Rabbi Richard A. Block (Emeritus)
- Status: Active

Location
- Location: 26000 Shaker Boulevard, Beachwood, Ohio
- Country: United States
- Interactive map of Temple Tifereth-Israel
- Coordinates: 41°28′37″N 81°29′44″W

Architecture
- Type: Synagogue architecture
- Established: 1850 (as a congregation)
- Completed: 1855 (Huron and Miami); 1894 (Willson Avenue); 1924 (The University Temple); 1969 (Beachwood)

Website
- ttti.org

The Temple Tifereth-Israel (transliterated from Hebrew as "Glory of Israel") was a Reform Jewish congregation and synagogue, located at 26000 Shaker Boulevard, in Beachwood, a suburb of Cleveland, Ohio, in the United States. The synagogue was a member of the Union for Reform Judaism. On 1 July 2024, Tifereth-Israel merged with Anshe Chesed Fairmount Temple to create a new Reform congregation, Mishkan Or, located at the site of Tifereth-Israel.

== History ==
=== Early years ===
The Tifereth Israel congregation was founded on May 26, 1850, as a number of families disputed over religious ritual and left the Orthodox Anshe Chesed congregation, the first Jewish congregation in Cleveland. The same year, Rabbi Isidor Kalisch, who had been rabbi at Anshe Chesed, was appointed the first rabbi of Tifereth Israel.

A $3,000 bequest from the estate of Judah Touro, a New Orleans philanthropist, enabled the congregation to establish its first synagogue building on Huron and Miami Streets, dedicated on December 14, 1855. In the 1860s and 1870s, the congregation instituted reforms and, in 1873, became a founding member of the Union of American Hebrew Congregations. Under the leadership of Rabbi Moses J. Gries, in 1894 the congregation dedicated a new synagogue at Willson Avenue that became known as the Willson Avenue Temple, or simply, the Temple.

=== 1924 University Temple building ===
Rabbi Abba Hillel Silver assumed leadership in 1917 and served for the next 46 years, until his death in 1963. In 1924 Silver established the impressive University Temple, or more simply, The Temple, and later, the Silver Sanctuary, located in University Circle, Cleveland.

This large building was used by the congregation until 1969. As of January 2024, this building was used for High Holy Days, special events, and life cycle celebrations.

Silver was succeeded by his son, Daniel Jeremy Silver, who had earlier served under his father's direction as an Assistant Rabbi. In 1990, the congregation rededicated The University Temple as the Silver Sanctuary, in their honor.

=== Beachwood complex ===
As the congregation moved further east, a property at Beachwood was acquired and initially built as a school and community center, dedicating the new temple in 1969. The complex functioned as one of several Jewish centers of community with a religious school and services as well. It contained a library and a museum, as well as several chapels and sanctuaries.

The Maltz Museum of Jewish Heritage is located next to The Temple in Beachwood and houses part of the Temple Museum's collection. During 1994 and 1995, the Beachwood temple renovated interiors that included the installation of additional showcases for museum exhibits in the East Building.

== Rabbinical leadership ==
The following individuals served as senior rabbi of the Tifereth-Israel congregation:

Ordinal	Officeholder	Term start	Term end	Time in office	Notes
1	Isidor Kalisch	1850	1867	16–17 years	
2	Jacob Mayer	1867	1874	6–7 years	
3	Aaron Hahn	1874	1892	17–18 years	
4	Moses J. Gries	1892	1917	24–25 years	
5	Abba Hillel Silver	1917	1963	45–46 years	
6	Daniel Jeremy Silver	1963	1989	25–26 years	
7	Ben Kamin	1989	2000	10–11 years	Contract terminated
8	Richard A. Block	2001	July 1, 2018	16–17 years	Appointed Senior Rabbi Emeritus in 2018
9	Jonathan Cohen	July 1, 2018	June 30, 2024	5–6 years	
