= Abba Hillel Silver =

American rabbi and Zionist leader

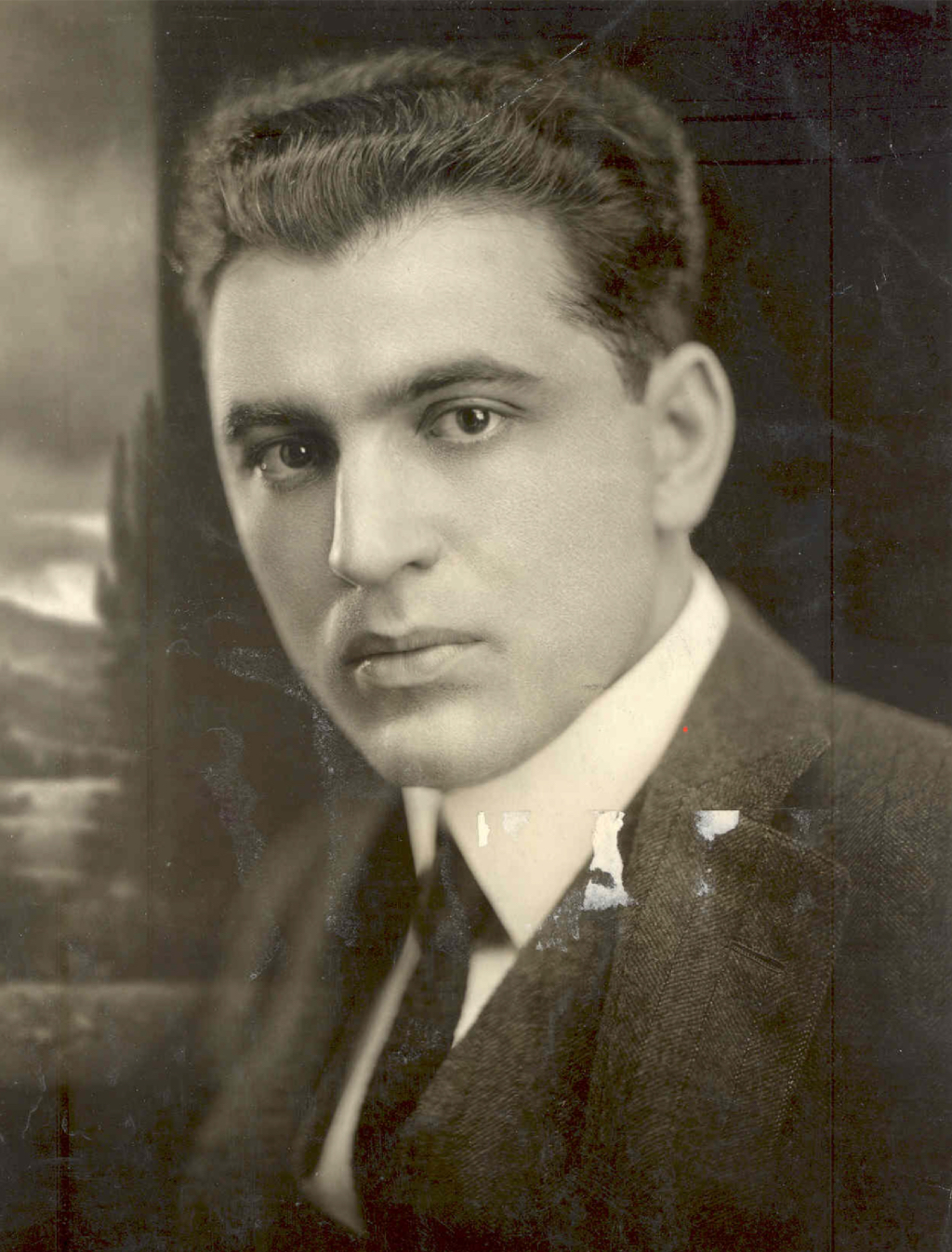
- Abba Hillel Silver c. 1920
- Born: Abba Hillel Silver; January 28, 1893; Lithuania
- Died: November 28, 1963 (aged 70); Cleveland, Ohio
- Occupation: President of the Zionist Organization of America
- Known for: Representative of the American Zionist movement at World Zionist Congress

Signature
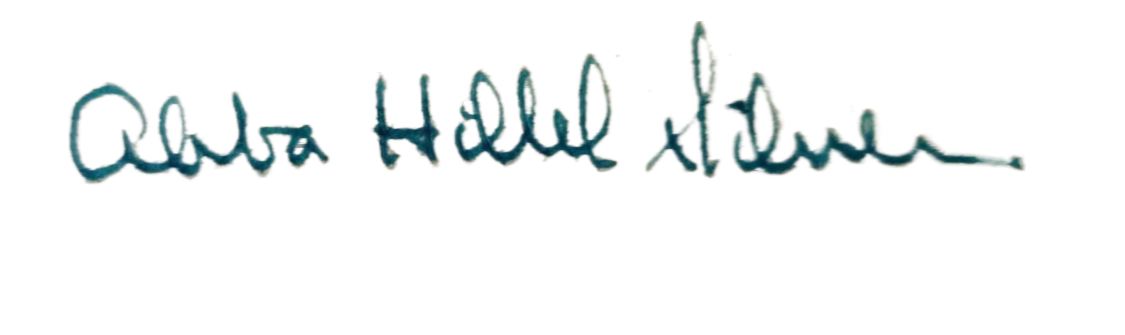

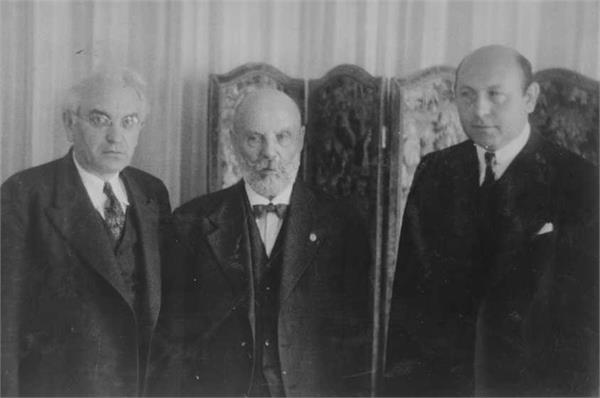
Abba Hillel Silver, Menachem Ussishkin and Israel Goldstein during a Zionist Congress, 1937.

Abba Hillel Silver (January 28, 1893 – November 28, 1963) was an American rabbi and Zionist leader. He was a key figure in the mobilization of American support for the founding of the State of Israel.

== Biography ==
Born as Abraham Silver in Naumiestis, located in the Suwałki Governorate of Congress Poland, which was part of the Russian Empire (now in present-day Lithuania), he was the son and grandson of Orthodox rabbis and was brought to the United States at the age of nine. A Zionist from his youth, he made his first speech at a Zionist meeting at age fourteen. Educated in the public schools and after-school Jewish schools of New York City's Lower East Side, he left after high school to attend the Hebrew Union College (HUC) and the University of Cincinnati. After graduating as valedictorian of his HUC class and his ordination in 1915—and now known as Abba Hillel Silver—he served as rabbi of a small congregation, Leshem Shomayim, in West Virginia (now Temple Shalom). In 1917, at age twenty-four, he became rabbi of The Temple–Tifereth Israel in Cleveland, Ohio, one of the nation's largest and best-known Reform congregations, where he served for 46 years.

Silver was an early champion of rights for labor, workers' compensation, and civil liberties, though his highest priorities were to advance respect for and support of Zionism. He first canvassed Reform Jewish congregations, followed by American Jewry, then the American public and politicians, and finally the international community, particularly the United Nations, together with his close friend Emanuel Neumann. Silver was a keynote speaker in the Allied Jewish Campaign to raise funds jointly for Zionist projects in Palestine and for European Jewry.

At a meeting of the American Zionist Emergency Council in May 1944, Silver argued that "our overemphasizing the refugee issue has enabled our opponents to state that, if it is rescue you are concerned about, why don’t you concentrate on that and put the politics aside...It is possible for the Diaspora to undermine the Jewish state, because the urgency of the rescue issue could lead the world to accept a temporary solution...We should place increased emphasis on fundamental Zionist ideology."

Silver was one of the chief Zionist spokesmen appearing before the United Nations in the Palestine hearings of 2 October 1947 in what the Israeli government says was the future nation's acceptance speech, two weeks before Moshe Shertok made the case for Israel on 17 October 1947. Silver accepted the United Nations Partition Plan for Palestine as the best means to rapidly create a homeland for the Jewish people. After the plan was approved in the UN (33 to 13 votes), Silver wrote:

We extend a hand of genuine friendship to the new Arab state which is to be established in Palestine. The Jewish nation in Palestine will be eager to cooperate fully with its Arab neighbor and to contribute within the framework of the economic union to the progress and prosperity of the whole of Palestine. In this historic hour we call upon the Arab people of Palestine and all neighboring Arab countries to join with us in an era of peaceful and fruitful collaboration.

Silver was a leading proponent of Zionism in America and met with President Harry S. Truman several times to discuss his views until his uncompromising manner caused friction with the White House, leading to estrangement from the Truman White House, including Truman's appearance on national television to announce the formation of the State of Israel. The story of his pounding on Harry Truman's desk at the White House, however, after much research by Rafael Medoff, has been shown to be untrue.

By rallying both Jewish and non-Jewish support, and fostering a relationship with the Republican Party that led to the inclusion of a pro-Israel plank in their 1948 platform, Silver forced Truman to support Israel and to recognize the country immediately after it declared its independence.

A nationally-known orator and author of many scholarly works, including important studies of the history of Jewish-Christian relations, Silver also served as head of many Jewish and Zionist organizations.

He died on November 28, 1963, and was interred at Mayfield Cemetery in Cleveland Heights, Ohio.

== Works ==
- A History of Messianic Speculation in Israel from the First through the Seventeenth Centuries. New York: Macmillan Company. 1927.
- The Democratic Impulse in Jewish History. New York: Bloch Publishing Company. 1928.
- Religion in a Changing World. New York: R.R. Smith. 1930.
- The World Crisis and Jewish Survival: A Group of Essays. New York: R.R. Smith. 1941.
- Vision and Victory: A Collection of Addresses, 1942-1948. New York: Zionist Organization of America. 1949.
- Where Judaism Differed: An Inquiry into the Distinctiveness of Judaism. New York: Macmillan. 1956.
- Moses and the Original Torah. New York: MacMillan. 1961.
- Weiner, Herbert, ed. (1967). Selected Sermons, Addresses, and Writings of Abba Hillel Silver. New York: World Pub. Co.

== See also ==
- Temple Tifereth-Israel, Beachwood, Ohio
