= History of the Jews in Greater Cleveland =

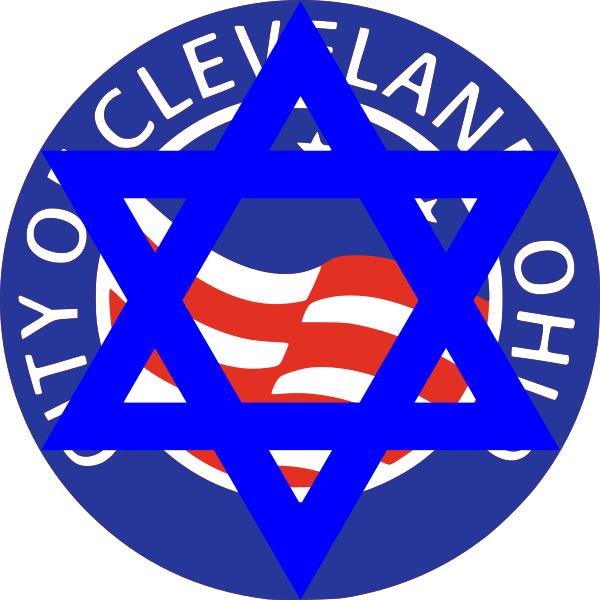
The logo of Cleveland with the Star of David on top of it

The Jewish community of the Greater Cleveland area comprises a significant ethnoreligious population of the U.S. State of Ohio. Jews from Bavaria immigrated in the 1830s and its size has significantly grown in the decades since then. In the early 21st century, Ohio's census data reported over 150,000 Jews, with the Cleveland area being home to more than 50% of this population. As of 2018, Greater Cleveland is the 23rd largest Jewish community in the United States. As of 2023, the Cleveland Jewish Community is estimated to be about 100,000 people.

In 2012, the Jewish Population in Greater Cleveland was estimated at 80,800. Over the next few years, Cleveland saw a rapid influx of Jews particularly within the city’s Orthodox Jewish and corporate business communities. Cleveland’s sudden emergence as a business city in the 2010s prompted thousands of young Jewish professionals to move all over the city, including the west side to areas such as Lakewood and Tremont. Cleveland’s Orthodox community saw rapid growth based on an influx of Jews fleeing worsening conditions and rising antisemitism in New York, New Jersey, as well as from Europe. Lower real estate prices than in East Coast major cities also attracted many Jewish people to Cleveland.

== History ==
In 1839, the first Jewish immigrants came to Cleveland from Bavaria. The first Jewish immigrant was a man named Simson Thorman. Within 25 years, the population of Jews grew to 1,200.

From the late 1800s and well into the 1950s, the vast majority of Jews lived in the inner city neighborhoods of Glenville, Kinsman, and Hough. In 1920, the Jewish population grew up to 90,000.

By the 1940s, many Jews lived in Glenville, Kinsman, Hough, and the then newly built Shaker Heights and Cleveland Heights neighborhoods. There were dozens of synagogues spread throughout these neighborhoods, which were diverse in terms of wealth based class of Cleveland Jews. Glenville, Kinsman, and Hough were older neighborhoods in the inner city with densely built tenement houses, while the Heights was considered a wealthier neighborhood, given the mansions that had been built there throughout the early 1900s. E.105th Street in Cleveland was often referred to as "Yiddishe Downtown", or "Jewish Downtown", as the busy street was filled with high rise buildings which held hundreds of Jewish owned businesses.

By the 1950s and 1960s, the Jewish Community rapidly started to move further into the then newly developed suburbs of Cleveland Heights, University Heights, Shaker Heights, South Euclid, and Beachwood. This left the once historically Jewish Glenville neighborhood into a majorly African American neighborhood.

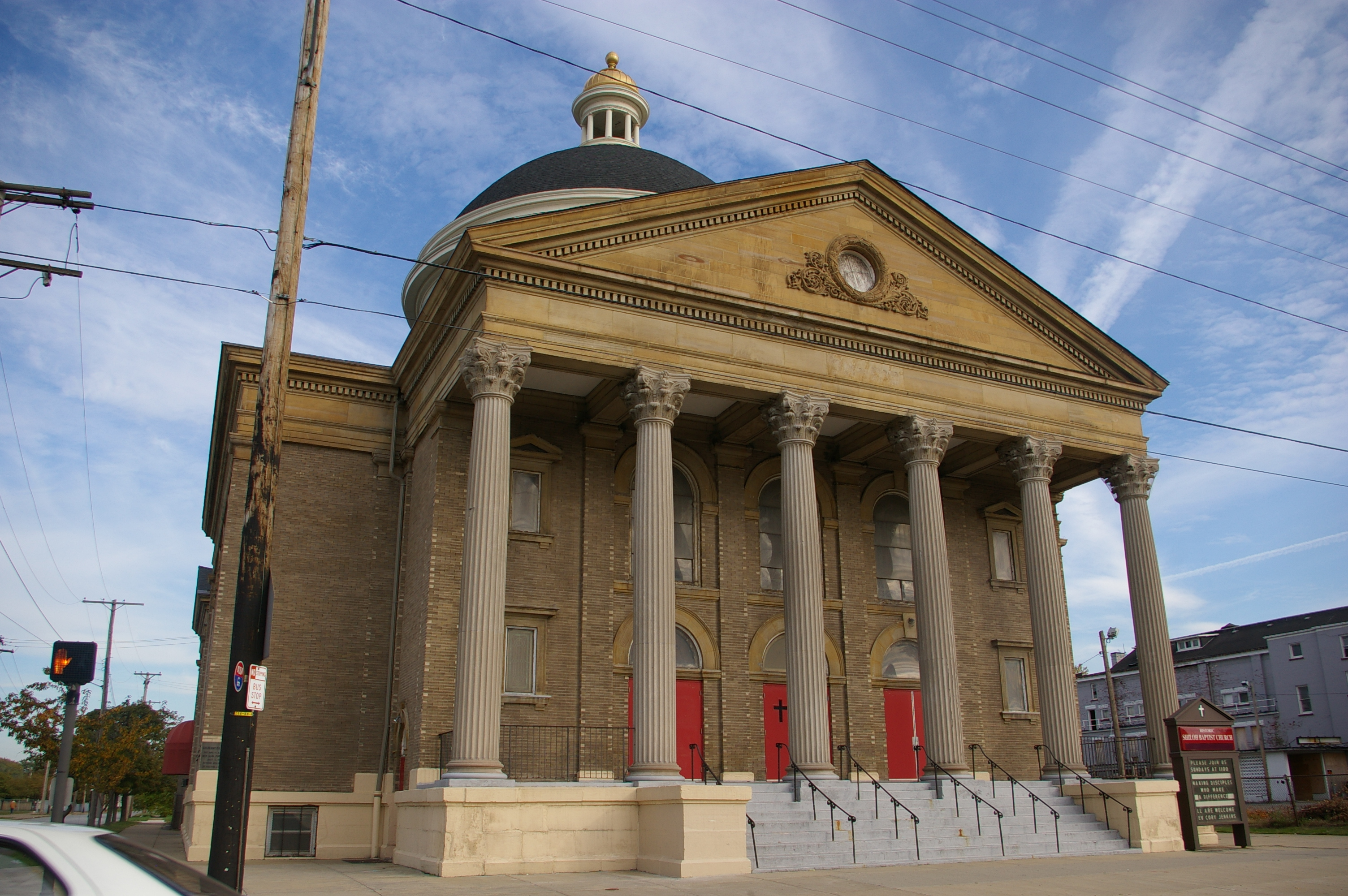
The former B'nai Jeshurun congregation building in the Central neighborhood of Cleveland, built in 1906. This neighborhood was once a thriving center of Jewish life.

By the 1980s, there were more than 150 Jewish organizations in the Greater Cleveland area.

As of 2023, there are about 100,000 Jewish Clevelanders who mostly live in the eastern suburbs of Beachwood, Solon, Moreland Hills, Pepper Pike, South Euclid, Lyndhurst, Shaker Heights, Cleveland Heights, University Heights and Orange. Many young Jewish business professionals live downtown and on the west side in neighborhoods such as Lakewood and Tremont.

=== Diaspora of Jews throughout Cleveland ===
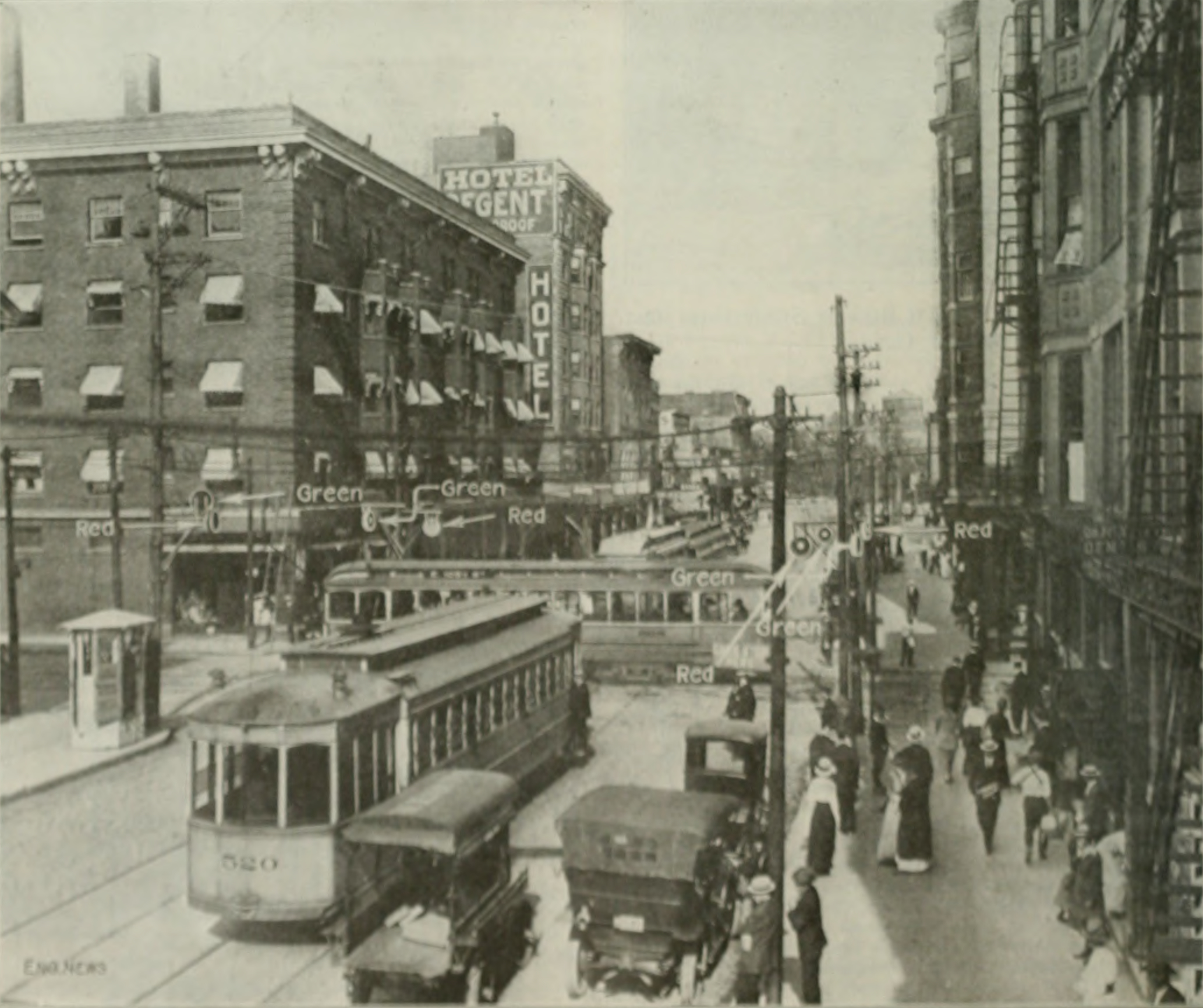
The corner of E.105th Street and Euclid Avenue, once a hub of daily Jewish life with Jewish-owned businesses

Like many other cities in the United States, Cleveland has seen several demographic shifts persist among various neighborhoods since the beginning of its foundation. Cleveland's Jewish community tended to follow the movement of other families in the inner city, pursuing better living conditions and moving jobs that weren't available in the densely populated inner city. As the Jews left for the suburbs, African Americans going through the Great Migration moved in. This often turned once predominantly Jewish inner city neighborhoods such as Glenville into African-American neighborhoods by the 1950s. Given that Jewish communities tend to maintain close, dense ties within them, Cleveland's Jewish demographic shift is seen through the movement of Jews through different neighborhoods over the decades.

Cleveland's first Jews settled in downtown Cleveland in 1839, with Cleveland's first few dozen Jewish families establishing the Cleveland Israelitic Society. This was the city's first synagogue, located on Eagle Street, now the site of Progressive Field. Over time, as Cleveland's Jewish population grew parallel to the city of Cleveland's growth and development into a major city, the Jewish community shifted east into what were then newly developed neighborhoods. By the mid-late 1800s, the majority of Cleveland's Jews lived in the Hough neighborhood of Cleveland. Several large and historic synagogues were built throughout the neighborhood, many of which are still standing as historic landmarks today, now being used as African-American churches.

By 1926, the majority of Cleveland's Jews had moved out of the Hough and Woodland neighborhoods for the further east Kinsman and Glenville neighborhoods. Glenville became a dense center of Jewish life in Cleveland, with the Jewish demographics of the neighborhood reaching above 90% in the 1930s. E.105th Street in Glenville is noted as once being a thriving Avenue of Jewish life, with dozens of Jewish grocery stores, shops, businesses, and synagogues once lining along the street. After World War II, the Jewish community started to follow other families in the inner city into the then newly developed neighborhoods in Cleveland Heights, Shaker Heights, and University Heights, often referred to as simply "Heights" by the Cleveland Jewish community.

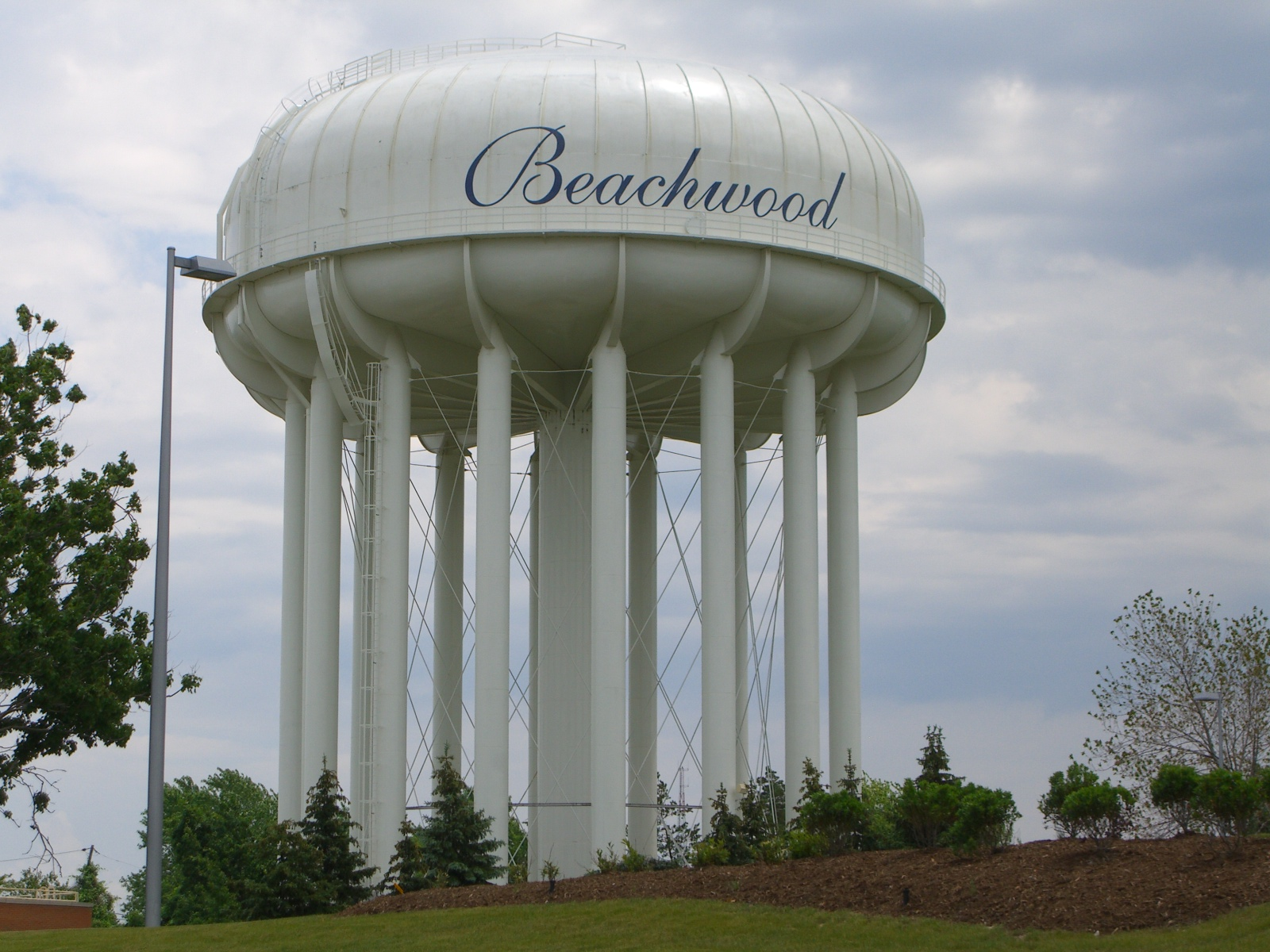
Beachwood, a suburb of Cleveland

In 1948, a heated village-wide debate was sparked in Beachwood after a proposal for the construction of the Anshe Chesed Fairmount Temple was presented to the village council, making it the first synagogue within the village limits of the then mostly non-Jewish neighborhood. Antisemitism persisted throughout the village for decades, and only increased with the proposal of the synagogue. The argument eventually turned into an Ohio Supreme Court case, which ruled that the synagogue must be allowed to be built on its current site in Beachwood. The large synagogue prompted congregants, mainly hundreds of Jewish families, to move to Beachwood. Hundreds of more Jewish families continued to move to Beachwood throughout the 1950s, with the rapid population growth prompting Beachwood to be established as a city in 1960. With Cleveland's 100,000 Jews now mostly living in the east side suburbs, the beginning of a halt in rapid movement started, creating the current demographics of a Jewish community seen today in Cleveland. By the mid 1970s as the Jewish community grew, Jews started to move into the newly developed neighborhoods of Orange and Pepper Pike, and continued to move southeast into Solon by the 1990s. The eastern suburbs of Cleveland continue to hold a thriving Jewish community today.

Beachwood in particular is regarded by locals as being the center of Jewish life in Cleveland, given that the city has over a dozen Jewish institutions including several synagogues of all denominations, the Mandel Jewish Community Center, the Jewish Federation of Cleveland, the Cleveland Jewish News headquarters, Menorah Park, The Maltz Museum of Jewish Heritage, as well as dozens of Jewish owned businesses and organizations. The city of Beachwood is known as being “one of the most Jewish neighborhoods outside of Israel”, with a per capita Jewish population being one of the highest in the United States.

== Education ==
There are five Jewish Day Schools in Greater Cleveland: The Joseph and Florence Mandel Jewish Day School, Gross Schechter Day School, Fuchs Mizrachi School, Yeshiva Derech Hatorah, and the Hebrew Academy of Cleveland. Approximately 10,000 students attend these schools. While Mandel JDS and Schechter educate up to 8th Grade, the Orthodox Schools educate through High School.

The Mandel family is known for large donations to Jewish organizations throughout the community, especially relating to education. The philanthropic family has given millions to places like Mandel JDS, the local JCC, Cuyahoga Community College, Cleveland State University, and Case Western Reserve University.

Akiva High School of Cleveland is a school that offers programs and classes for Jewish high schoolers in a variety of fields, including Hebrew classes, Israel advocacy, and other Jewish studies.

Beachwood High School, a school with one of the highest percentage of Jewish students, offers Hebrew as a foreign language class. Most public and private East Side suburban schools with significant numbers of Jewish students have a Jewish Student Union Club.

The Telshe Yeshiva, a rabbinical college relocated from Lithuania to the Greater Cleveland area in 1941 during the Holocaust, has a main campus in Wickliffe.

== Jewish youth in Greater Cleveland ==
There are several Jewish youth group chapters in Greater Cleveland, including BBYO, USY, NCSY, and NFTY.

Greater Cleveland is home to the BBYO Region, Ohio Northern Region #23. ONR BBYO has been a staple of Jewish teens in the area since the 1930s, and since then has grown to the size it is today. ONR has approximately 600 members, with which they hold several annual conventions with the entire region. The Ohio Northern Region, based in Cleveland but also branched in Akron/Canton, Toledo, and Youngstown, have 17 different AZA and BBG Chapters. There are 8 ONR Chapters in Greater Cleveland.

Camp Wise is a Jewish summer camp located east of Cleveland in Chardon. Since 1907, Camp Wise has been the summer home to hundreds of Jewish kids and teens from grades 2-10 every year. Though the camp serves mostly campers from Cleveland, campers as well as counselors from around the world attend. Approximately 370 campers attend each session.

Most synagogues in Cleveland offer a wide variety of programs for Jewish kids and teens.

Akiva Cleveland is a school in Beachwood that teaches Jewish teens with Hebrew lessons, learning about Israel, and other Jewish studies.

== Jewish Institutions in Greater Cleveland ==
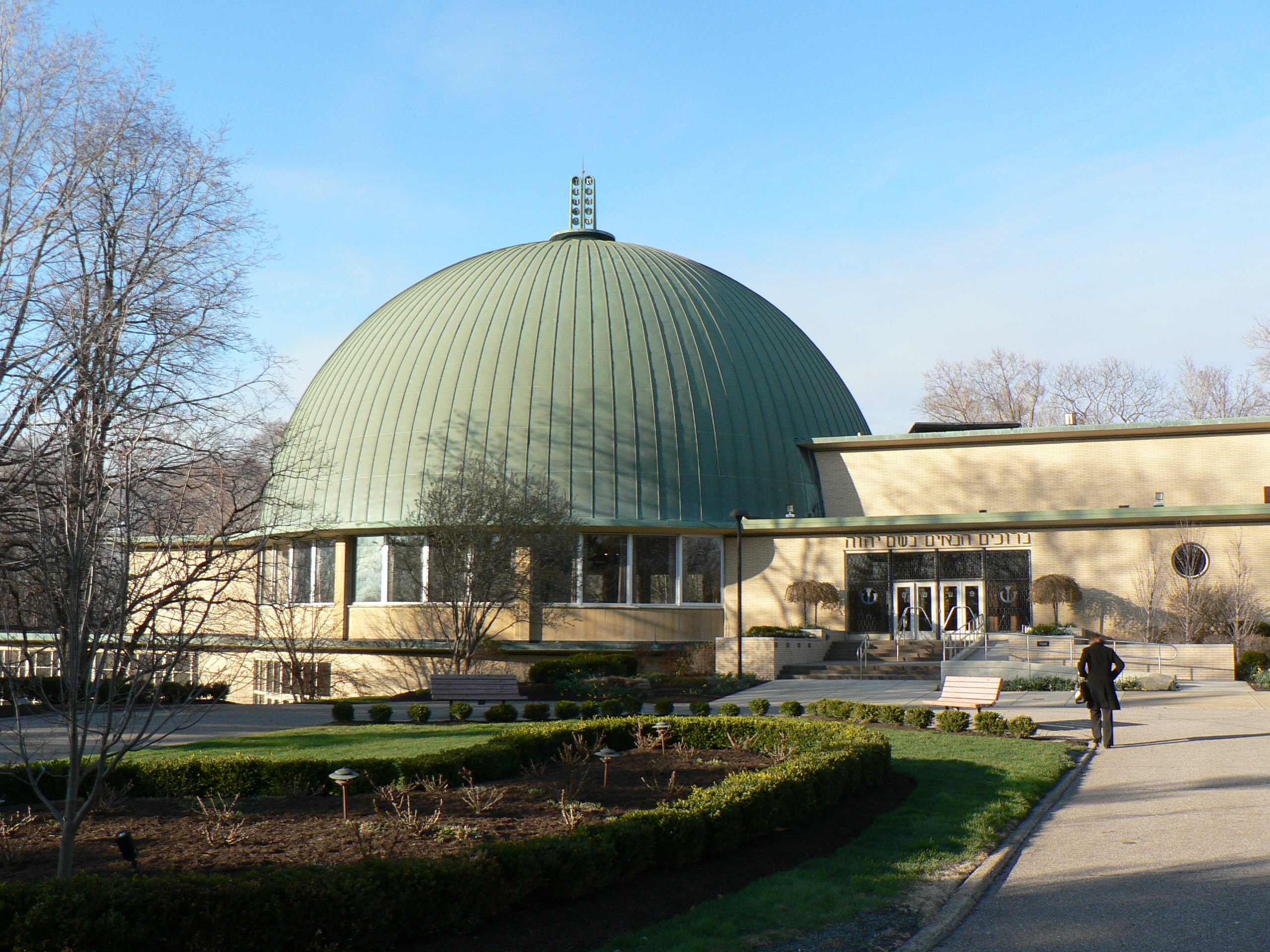
Park Synagogue, a suburban Cleveland synagogue in Cleveland Heights

There are many Jewish Institutions in the Greater Cleveland Jewish Community:

- The Jewish Federation of Cleveland is headquartered in Beachwood.
- The Maltz Museum of Jewish Heritage is in Beachwood.
- The Cleveland Jewish News is the local Jewish newspaper headquartered in Beachwood.
- The Mandel Jewish Community Center, located in Beachwood, is a center point of the Jewish community.
- The Workmen's Circle of Cleveland is a Jewish lodge group.
- The Friendship Circle Organization for children with special needs has a center in Pepper Pike.
- Menorah Park is a Jewish nursing home complex in Beachwood.
- The Cleveland Hillel is located on the Case Western Reserve University campus.

=== Synagogues in Greater Cleveland ===
There are dozens of synagogues of several denominations in Greater Cleveland. There are multiple Orthodox, Reform, Reconstructionist, and Conservative synagogues.

All synagogues may not be listed. Unregistered Shtiebel synagogues exist in some homes, with congregations as small as only a few families.

- Agudath B'nai Israel, Lorain; Conservative
- Ahavas Yisroel, Cleveland Heights; Orthodox
- Aish Hatorah, University Heights; Orthodox
- Anshe Chesed Fairmount Temple, Beachwood; Reform
- Beachwood Kehilla, Beachwood; Orthodox
- Beth El- The Heights Synagogue, Cleveland Heights
- Beth Israel- Westside Temple, West Park, Cleveland proper; Reform
- B'nai Jeshurun, Pepper Pike; Conservative
- Chabad of Cleveland Heights, Cleveland Heights; Orthodox
- Chabad at Case Western Reserve University, University Circle, Cleveland proper; multi-denominational
- Chabad of Downtown Cleveland, Downtown Cleveland, Cleveland proper; multi-denominational
- Chabad House of Cleveland, University Heights; Orthodox
- Chabad of Mayfield, Mayfield Heights; multi-denominational
- Chabad of Solon, Solon; Orthodox
- Chabad of the West Side, Westlake; multi-denominational
- Chabad of Twinsburg, Twinsburg, multi-denominational
- Congregation Zichron Chaim, University Heights; Orthodox
- Congregation K'hal Yereim, Cleveland Heights; Orthodox
- Congregation Shaarey Tikvah, Beachwood; Conservative
- Congregation Shomre Shabbas, University Heights; Orthodox
- Fromovitz Chabad Center, Beachwood; Orthodox
- Green Road Synagogue, Beachwood; Orthodox
- Heights Jewish Center Synagogue, University Heights; Orthodox
- Jewish Secular Community of Cleveland, Solon;
- Kol Ha'lev, Pepper Pike; Reconstructionist
- Lubavitcher Rav of NE Ohio; Beachwood
- Oheb Zedek-Cedar Sinai Synagogue, Lyndhurst; Orthodox
- Oheb Zedek-Taylor Road Synagogue, Cleveland Heights; Orthodox
- Semach Sedek, South Euclid; Orthodox
- Suburban Temple Kol Ami, Beachwood; Reform
- Temple B'nai Abraham, Elyria; Reform
- Temple Emanu-El, Orange; Reform
- Temple Israel Ner Tamid, Mayfield Heights; Reform/Conservative
- Temple Tifereth Israel, Beachwood and University Circle; Reform
- The Park Synagogue, Cleveland Heights; Conservative
- Park Synagogue East, Pepper Pike; Conservative
- Semach Sedek RIAS Synagogue, South Euclid; Orthodox
- Torah U'tefila, Cleveland Heights; Orthodox
- Waxman Chabad Center, Beachwood; Orthodox
- Yeshivath Adath B'nai Israel, University Heights; Orthodox
- Young Israel of Greater Cleveland, Beachwood; Orthodox
- Zemach Zedek, Cleveland Heights; Orthodox

=== Jewish cemeteries ===
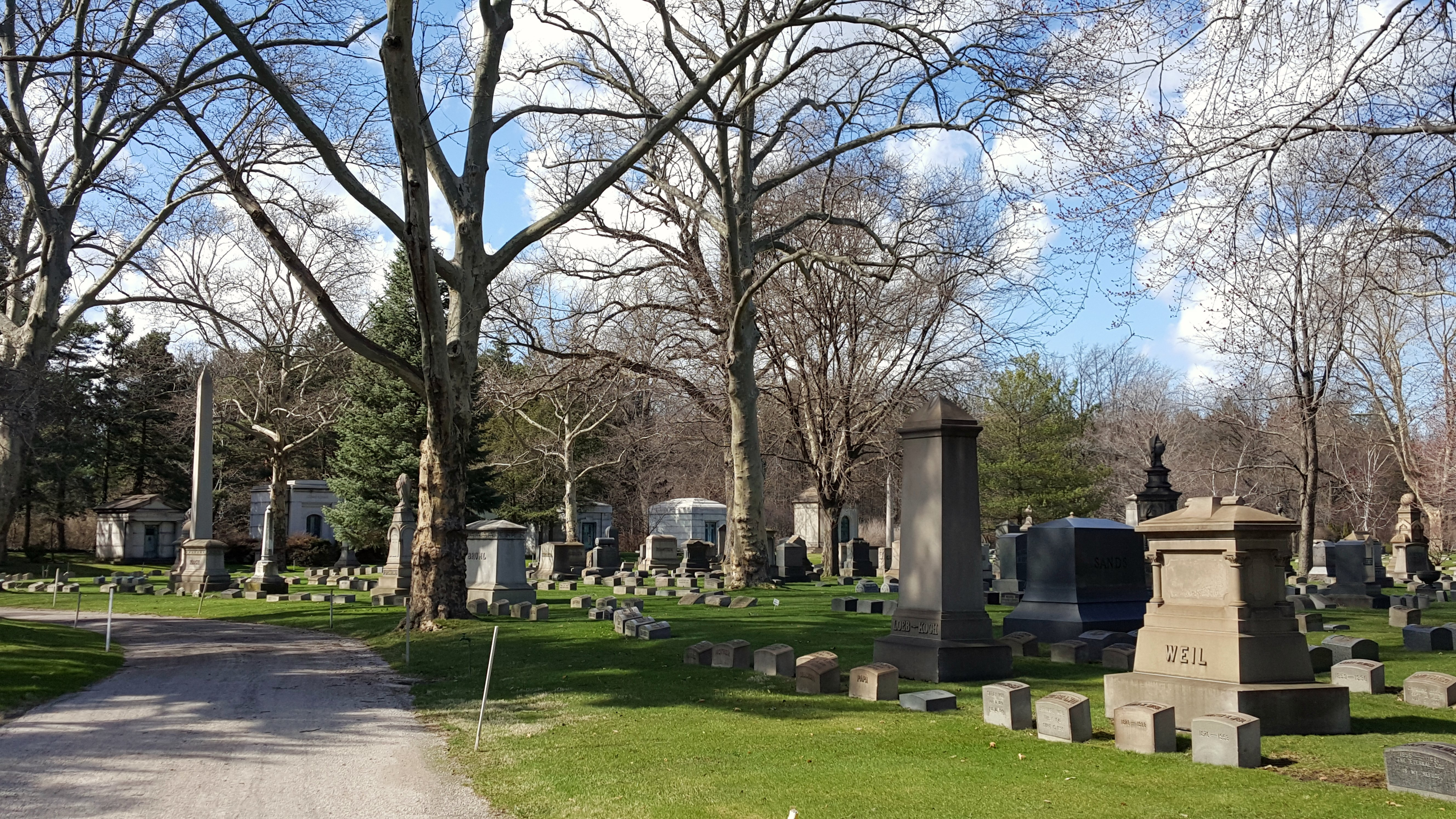
Mayfield Cemetery is a large and historically wealthy Jewish cemetery in Greater Cleveland. Many local celebrities including Olympian David Mark Berger and Senator Howard Metzenbaum are buried here.

There are 16 Jewish cemeteries and 3 Jewish sections of cemeteries in Cleveland. As of 2018, there are over 68,000 Jewish graves in the Cleveland area.

- Agudath Achim
- Baxter Cemetery
- Beachwood Cemetery (Oer Chodesh Section)
- Berger Cemetery
- Bet Olam Cemetery
- Chesed Shel Emeth Cemetery
- Chesterland Memorial Park
- Fir Street Cemetery
- Glenville Cemetery
- Harvard Cemetery
- Hillcrest Memorial Park Cemetery (Section)
- Lansing Cemetery
- Mayfield Cemetery
- Mt. Olive Cemetery
- Mt. Sinai Cemetery
- Ridge Road Cemetery
- Western Reserve Memorial Gardens
- Willet Street Cemetery
- Zion Memorial Cemetery

== Former Soviet Union (FSU)-Jewish community ==
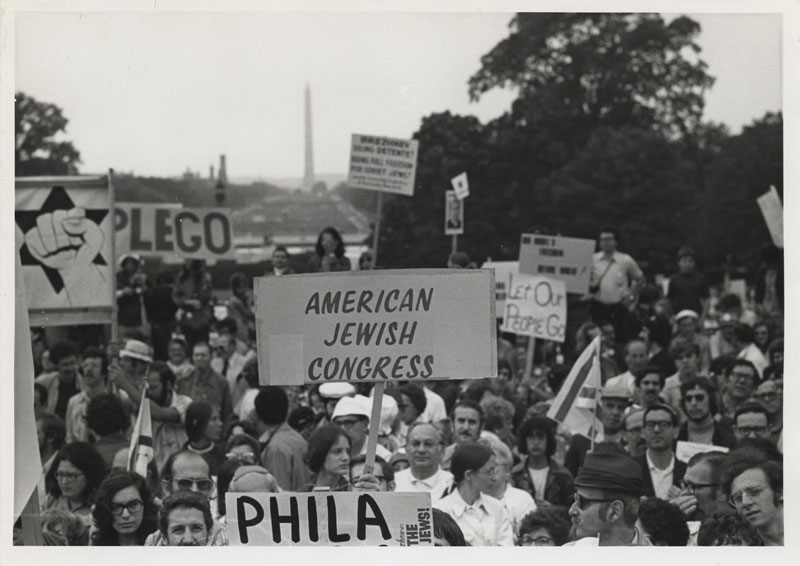
A rally in Washington D.C to advocate for the freedom of Soviet Jews to emigrate, a movement started by the Cleveland Council on Soviet Antisemitism

Greater Cleveland is home to one of the largest Former Soviet Union-Jewish populations in the U.S., after New York City. It is estimated that 10,000–15,000 Jews from the former Soviet Union reside in Greater Cleveland, most of whom live in Mayfield Heights, Solon, Beachwood, and Orange. Almost all Soviet immigrants to the U.S. (1970s-early 2000s) are Jewish. Cleveland is also home to Jewish owned Russian grocery stores, the largest being Yeleseyevsky Deli, as well as hundreds of FSU-Jewish owned and Russian speaking businesses such as restaurants, retail stores, jewelers, pharmacies, and private warehouses.

In 1963, The Cleveland Council on Soviet Antisemitism was one of the first councils in the U.S. that brought the attention of the lives of Jews living in the Soviet Union, a time in which pogroms were common, Jews were discriminatorily marked on their documentation, and Jewish citizens of the USSR were commonly arrested for false or over-exaggerated crimes (See Soviet Jewry Movement). The council's biggest attempt was not only to inform about antisemitism, but also to bring in as many Jewish refugees from the USSR as possible. From the 1960s throughout the 1980s, immigration was slow. But, with Mikhail Gorbachev's allowance of Jewish emigration in 1989, the Cleveland Jewish Community immediately resettled hundreds of Soviet-Jews in the Greater Cleveland area, most of whom moved into apartments in Mayfield Heights, East Cleveland, South Euclid and Cleveland Heights. Within a few years, the number of Soviet-Jewish refugees in Cleveland had risen to a few thousand, and by the early 2000s had reached about 15,000. The majority of Cleveland’s Soviet Jews arrived from Russia, Ukraine, Belarus, Moldova, and Uzbekistan.

Though Soviet-Jews typically started off poor in the U.S., many rapidly grew into the upper middle class within a matter of a few years. This particularly unusual case of immigrants becoming so rapidly successful is contributed to a mix of progressive Soviet education and former employment concentrated around the fields of science, engineering, doctoring, and literature, as well as with the help of the Cleveland Jewish Community with essentials such as childcare, employment finding, English classes at Cuyahoga Community College, and financial assistance with rent and housing.

Because the majority of Soviet-Jewish immigrants in the 1980s–2000s were young couples, thousands of new Russian-Jewish families were started in Cleveland, and bilingual English-and Russian-speaking children are currently raised in the area.

The influx of Soviet-Jewish immigrants also brought a new wave of Yiddish speakers to Greater Cleveland, an almost reverse effect than that of Jewish communities in the rest of the U.S. Yiddish is the second dominant language of Soviet Jews after Russian, especially for Jews coming from shtetls and cities with large historic Jewish populations in Ukraine, Belarus, and Moldova. Most Soviet Jews born before 1960 have skills in speaking Yiddish.

Greater Cleveland is also home to three predominantly Jewish Russian newspapers, Russian Magazine and Prospect being two of them. The newspapers serve most Russians and Russian Jews in the area. Also, because of the extensive advertising for local Russian businesses, all newspapers are free and are issued to whoever orders a subscription. Russian Magazine celebrated its 20th year of production in 2013. Newspapers include sections of political news of the U.S., Russia, and other world news, anecdotes, and extensive advertisements for Russian speaking job openings, private practice Russian dentists and doctors, and Russian speaking restaurants, stores, and businesses in the Cleveland area.

== Orthodox community ==
Greater Cleveland is home to an established Orthodox Jewish community. The area is home to an estimated 30,000 Orthodox Jews, including Hasidic Jews. There are fifteen Orthodox synagogues serving the Greater Cleveland community and three Jewish schools. Dozens of kosher restaurants, kosher grocery stores, Jewish bookstores, Hasidic clothing stores, as well as other Orthodox Jewish businesses are found around the Jewish community. The area is one of few locations in the world for the Telshe Yeshiva Rabbinical College. Greater Cleveland is also home to a notable sect of Hasidism, the Aleksander Hasidic Dynasty.

Greater Cleveland has an Eruv that covers the majority of the Orthodox neighborhoods, including Cleveland Heights, Beachwood, Shaker Heights, University Heights, and South Euclid. Following a severe winter storm on March 8, 2018, a part of the eruv connected to a power line was downed, the first time in over 33 years for this to happen.

There are many Orthodox organizations in Greater Cleveland. Aish Hatorah of Cleveland is an adult Judaic studies organization. Bellefaire JCB is a Jewish family organization. There are several mikvahs in Greater Cleveland.

== Notable people ==
The following list includes notable people from, who live, or who have lived in Greater Cleveland and are Jewish. This list also includes people who are not from Greater Cleveland but have lived or live in Greater Cleveland, and have made a significant impact in the Cleveland community.

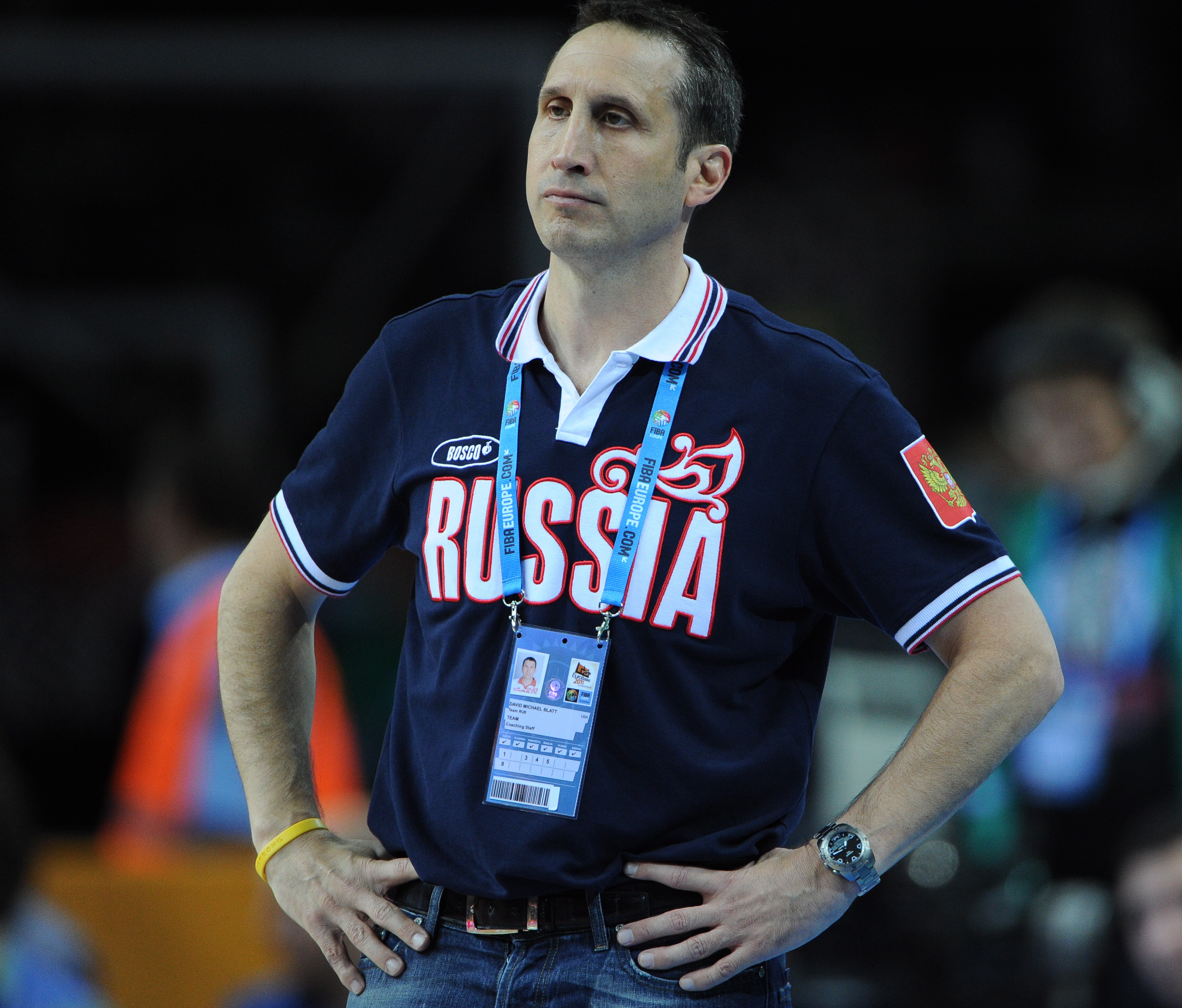
David Blatt was head coach of the Cleveland Cavaliers.

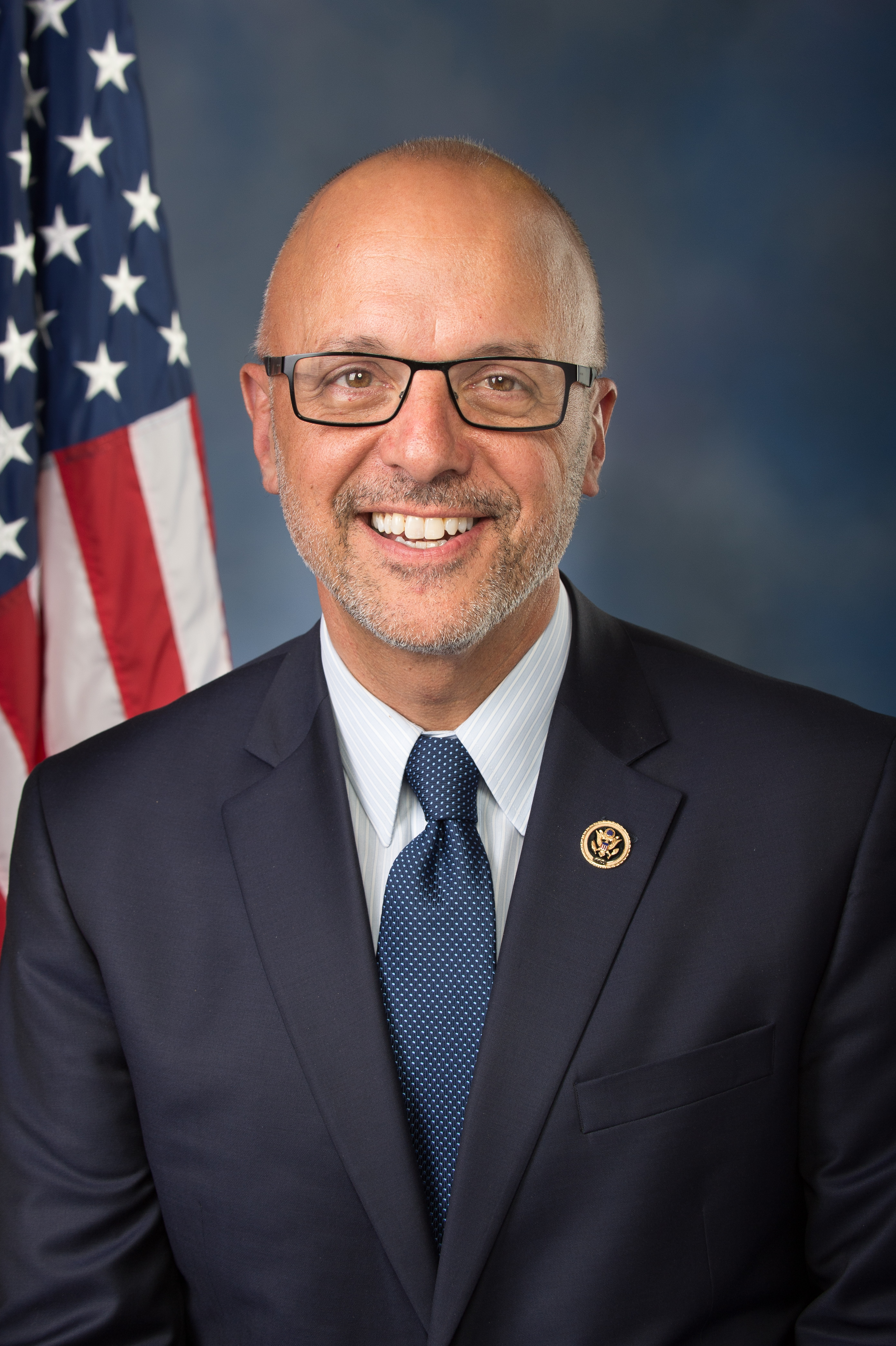
Ted Deutch, former congressman from Florida and CEO of American Jewish Committee, who formerly lived in Cleveland

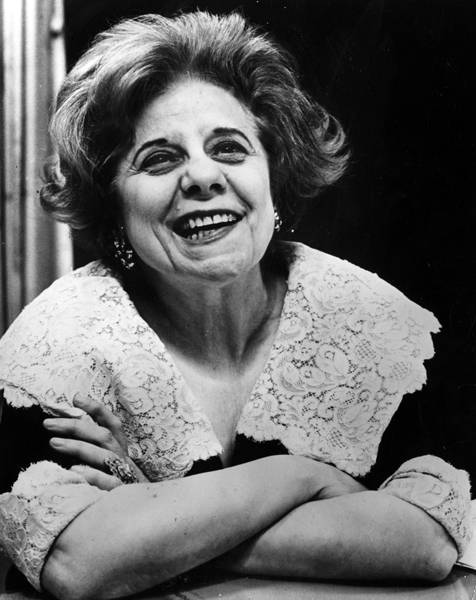
Dorothy Fuldheim, news anchor

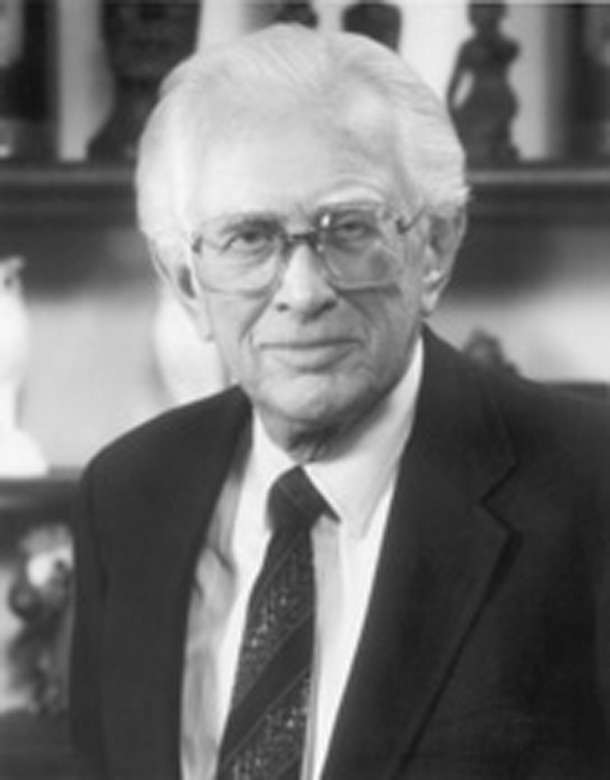
Senator Howard Metzenbaum

Paul Newman is from the Cleveland suburb of Shaker Heights.

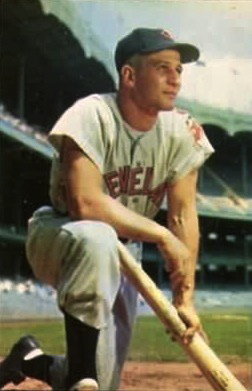
Al Rosen, a Cleveland Indians baseball player

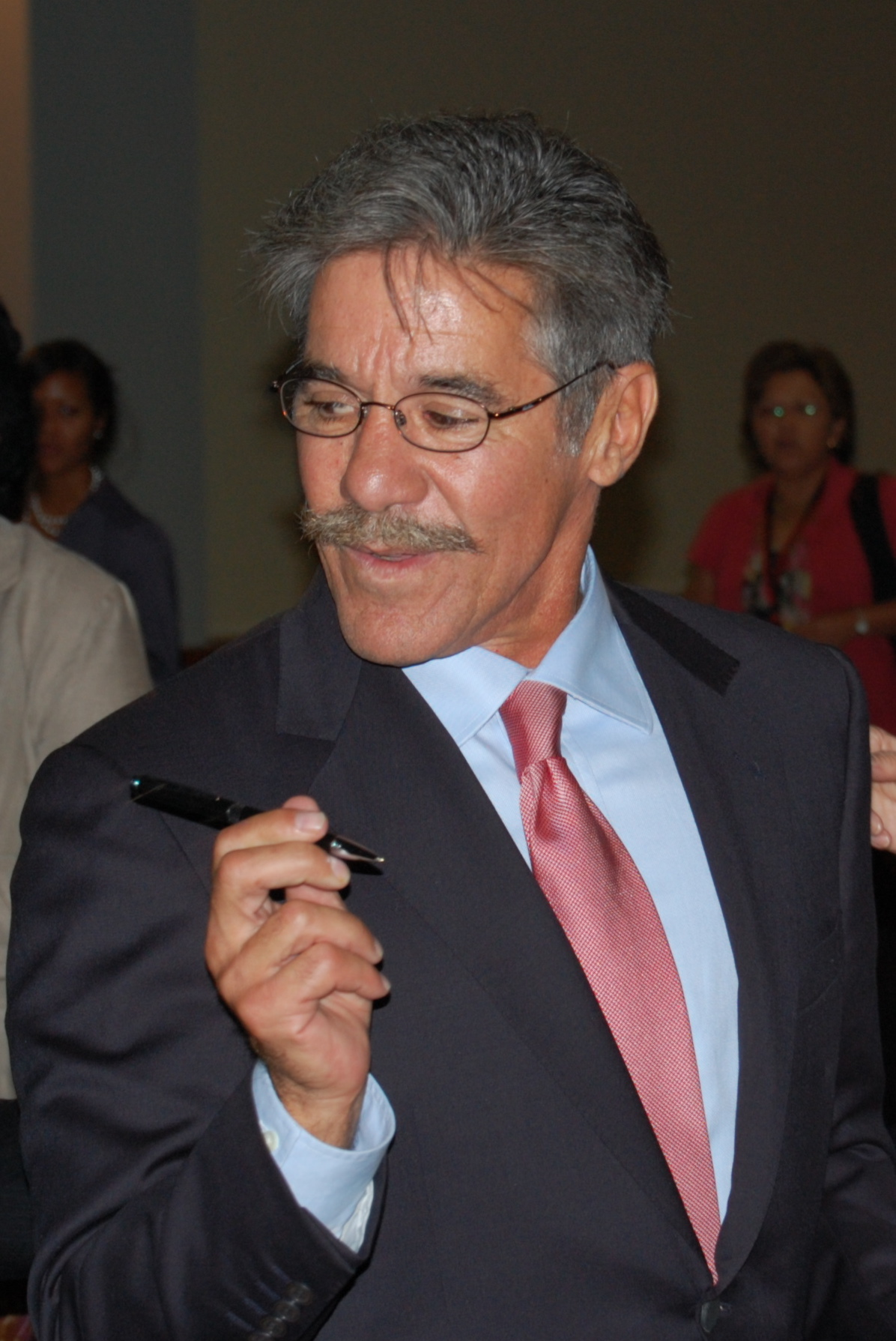
Geraldo Rivera, journalist and former talk show host

- Koby Altman, Cleveland Cavaliers general manager
- Vanessa Bayer, Saturday Night Live cast member, comedian
- William Bayer, author
- Arthur T. Benjamin, mathematician
- David Mark Berger, Olympic weightlifter, killed by Palestinian terrorists at the 1972 Olympic Games in Munich, West Germany
- David Blatt, former coach of the Cleveland Cavaliers
- Sara J. Bloomfield, director of United States Holocaust Museum
- Stuart Blumberg, writer and director
- Andy Borowitz, creator of the Fresh Prince of Bel-Air, author
- Armond Budish, executive of Cuyahoga County, 100th Speaker of the Ohio House of Representatives.
- Judith Butler, philosopher and gender theorist.
- Gary Cohn, former director of the National Economic Council, former COO of Goldman Sachs
- Marc Cohn, Grammy Award winning singer-songwriter, known for his 1991 hit Walking in Memphis and other songs
- Rebecca Dallet, Supreme Court of Wisconsin Judge
- Grand Rebbe Shneur Zalman Dancyger, Grand Rebbe of the Aleksander Hasidic dynasty
- Marc Dann, former Attorney General of Ohio
- William Daroff, chief executive officer of the Conference of Presidents of Major American Jewish Organizations
- Ted Deutch, CEO of American Jewish Committee, former US congressman from Florida since 2010, speaker at the 2016 Democratic National Convention
- Nachum Zev Dessler, rabbi, former head and dean of the Hebrew Academy of Cleveland
- Steven M. Dettelbach, lawyer, former director of the ATF, former United States Attorney for the Northern District of Ohio
- Mickey Edwards, former US Representative from Oklahoma
- Eric Ehrmann, writer
- Harry Eisenstat, former baseball player for Cleveland Indians
- Harlan Ellison, writer
- Eric Fingerhut, CEO of the Jewish Federations of North America, former president of Hillel International, Former US Congressman from Ohio and unsuccessful US Senate candidate
- Judah Folkman, scientist
- Lee Fisher, former Lieutenant Governor of Ohio under Ted Strickland and unsuccessful US Senate candidate, Dean of CSU Law School
- Dorothy Fuldheim, news anchor
- Alan Freed, disc jockey, known for coining the term Rock and Roll
- Benny Friedman, football player and coach
- Rabbi Mordechai Gifter, rosh yeshiva of Telz
- Donald A. Glaser, physicist, winner of the 1960 Nobel Prize in Physics
- Samuel Glazer, founder of Mr. Coffee
- Tamir Goodman, basketball player in Israel for Maccabi Tel Aviv
- Adele Goldberg, Computer Scientist
- Brad Goldberg, Chicago White Sox pitcher
- Joel Grey, actor
- Jerry Heller, rap group manager
- Joel Hyatt, businessman, entrepreneur, and politician; founder of Hyatt Legal Clinics. Ran unsuccessfully for US Senate. Son-in-law of Howard Metzenbaum
- Eliezer Jaffe, Israel Free Loan Association Founder
- Carol Kane, actress
- Mickey Katz, musician and comedian
- Allison Krause, Kent State Shooting Victim, Vietnam War Protester
- RB Kitaj, artist
- Ron Klein, former US congressman from Florida
- Hal Lebovitz, sportswriter
- Arthur Lelyveld, rabbi and noted social activist
- Joseph Lelyveld, New York Times executive editor
- Al Lerner, businessman, former owner of the Cleveland Browns
- Ari Lesser, Orthodox Jewish rapper
- D.A. Levy, poet
- Peter B. Lewis, philanthropist, former CEO of Progressive Corporation
- Roy Lichtenstein, Cartoonist
- Terri Libenson, creator of the comic, The Pajama Diaries
- Todd Lieberman, film producer
- Josh Mandel, former State Treasurer of Ohio, U.S. Senate candidate
- Morton Mandel, major philanthropist and businessman; his family is the namesake of several Jewish organizations and buildings around the community
- Howard Metzenbaum, Former US senator from Ohio in 1974 and 1976–1995
- Eric A. Meyer, web designer and author
- Aaron David Miller, Diplomat, CNN Analyst
- Sam Miller, noted businessman and philanthropist
- Paul Newman, actor and director
- Susan Orlean, journalist
- Paul Palnik, artist, writer, and teacher
- Harvey Pekar, cartoonist
- Dan Polster, federal judge of the United States District Court for the Northern District of Ohio
- Sally Priesand, first female rabbi in the United States ordained by a rabbinical seminary
- Bruce Ratner, real estate developer, former minority owner of Brooklyn Nets
- Carole Rendon, former US Attorney for the Northern District of Ohio
- Geraldo Rivera, TV personality
- Al Rosen, four-time all-star baseball player for the Cleveland Indians
- Louis Rosenblum, philanthropist and activist
- Milton Shapp, former Governor of Pennsylvania, presidential candidate in the 1976 Presidential Election
- Michael Sherwin, Former Acting United States Attorney for the District of Columbia
- Chaim Schochet, real estate executive and developer.
- Mitchell Schwartz, offensive lineman for the Kansas City Chiefs, formerly for the Cleveland Browns
- Rob Senderoff, basketball coach for Kent State
- Jerry Siegel, co-creator of Superman with Joe Shuster
- Rabbi Abba Hillel Silver, prominent rabbi who met with President Harry Truman in promoting the creation of the State of Israel
- Joe Shuster, co-creator of Superman with Jerry Siegel
- Ray Solomonoff, inventor of algorithmic probability
- Robert L. Stark, real estate developer and founder and CEO of Stark Enterprises
- Rabbi Pesach Stein, Rosh Yeshiva of Telz
- Michael Wager, lawyer, Congressional candidate
- Max Wiznitzer, noted doctor
- Bert Wolstein, philanthropist and businessman
- Milton A. Wolf, United States Ambassador to Austria
- Lew Wasserman, talent agent, won the Presidential Medal of Freedom in 1995
- Richard Zare, Professor
