= Beachwood City Schools =

School district in Ohio, United States

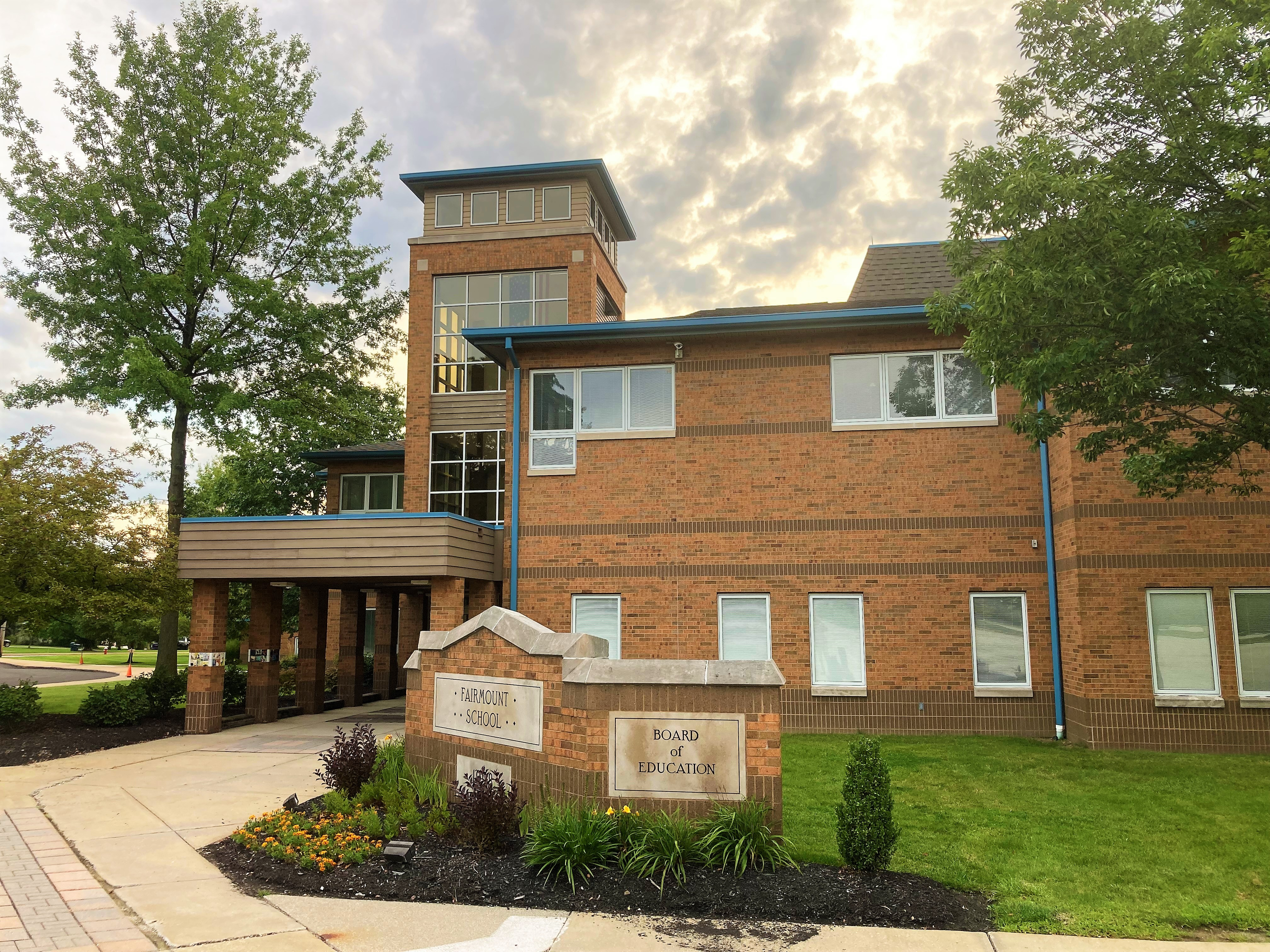

Address
- 24601 Fairmount Boulevard Beachwood, Ohio; United States
- Coordinates: 41°28′56″N 81°30′14″W

District information
- Type: Public
- Grades: PK–12
- Superintendent: Robert Hardis
- School board: Beachwood Board of Education
- NCES District ID: 3904355

Students and staff
- Students: 1,586 (2025–2026)
- Teachers: 107.32 (on an FTE basis) (2025–2026)
- Staff: 386.26 (on an FTE basis) (2025–2026)
- Student–teacher ratio: 14.78 (2025–2026)

Other information
- Website: www.beachwoodschools.org

Beachwood City Schools is a public school district that serves Beachwood, Ohio. The district has about 1,500 students from pre-kindergarten to 12th grade and comprises Fairmount Early Childhood Center, Bryden Elementary, Hilltop Elementary, Beachwood Middle School, and Beachwood High School.

== Notable alumni ==
- Marc Cohn - singer
- Terren Peizer - investor and business executive convicted of insider trading and securities fraud
- Jonathan Goldstein - screenwriter, television writer and producer, and film director
- Josh Mandel - politician
