= Gabasync =

Proposed but ineffective treatment for methamphetamine addiction

Gabasync is an ineffective treatment promoted for methamphetamine addiction, although it had also been claimed to be effective for dependence on alcohol or cocaine. It was marketed as PROMETA. The treatment, based loosely on research of a Spanish psychologist, involved a combination of three medications (gabapentin, flumazenil and hydroxyzine) as well as therapy. While the individual drugs had been approved by the FDA, their off-label use for addiction treatment has not. Gabasync was marketed by Hythiam, Inc. which is owned by Terren Peizer, a former junk bond salesman who has since been indicted for securities fraud relative to another company. Hythiam has sought to patent the protocol and charges up to $15,000 per patient to license its use (of which half goes to the prescribing physician, and half to Hythiam). Lower rates are offered to the criminal justice system, where it has been used in drug court pilot programs.

In November 2011, the results of a double-blind, placebo-controlled study (financed by Hythiam and carried out at UCLA) were published in the peer-reviewed journal Addiction. It concluded that Gabasync is ineffective: "The PROMETA protocol, consisting of flumazenil, gabapentin and hydroxyzine, appears to be no more effective than placebo in reducing methamphetamine use, retaining patients in treatment or reducing methamphetamine craving."

== History ==
In 2004 Terren Peizer, a former junk bond salesman, founded Hythiam Inc., a tiny pharmaceutical company, from which in 2006 when he was majority shareholder he received $1.3 million in compensation. The firm bought the rights to an ineffective addiction treatment, and marketed it. Despite the fact that no placebo-controlled or double-blind study or peer-reviewed publication of its "Prometa" (the marketing name for Gabasync) approach had been undertaken, and although no FDA approval had been obtained, Hythiam advertised the "innovative, medically based treatment" (which could cost $15,000 per patient) and franchised doctors to use Prometa, in exchange for a per-patient fee. Barrons, in a November 2005 article entitled "Curb Your Cravings For This Stock", wrote "If the venture works out for patients and the investing public, it'll be a rare success for Peizer, who's promoted a series of disappointing small-cap medical or technology stocks ... since his days at Drexel". Peizer said: "Hythiam is my biggest triumph. If it's the only thing I did, then my life would have been a tremendous success."

Journalist Scott Pelley said to Peizer in 2007: "Depending and who you talk to, you're either a revolutionary or a snake oil salesman." 60 Minutes, NBC News, and The Dallas Morning News criticized Peizer after the company bypassed clinical studies and government approval when bringing to market Prometa; the addiction drug proved to be completely ineffective. Journalist Adam Feuerstein opined: "most of what Peizer says is dubious-sounding hype". In June 2008, Hythiam had generated a net loss each year for 5 straight years, and while its stock had traded at $61.26 a share in 2007, it traded at $0.18 per share three years later. According to independent investment research firm Morningstar: "Over the long haul, this company has posted some of its industry's worst returns on assets."

== Treatment steps ==
For alcohol dependence, the treatment consists of flumazenil (administered intravenously), hydroxyzine, and gabapentin. The treatment is similar for stimulant dependence, with additional flumazenil administrations. The dosing regimen of the drug combination is discussed in Urschel's study. The initial intravenous administrations are followed up by orally prescribed medications and behavioral treatment.

== Controlled studies ==
Preliminary evidence that a regimen combining hydroxyzine, flumazenil, and gabapentin (the active pharmacological components of Gabasync) can help decrease methamphetamine cravings and use was first published in October 2007 following a relatively small, open-label trial by Dr. Harold C. Urschel. The study, funded by Hythiam, was published in the Mayo Clinic Proceedings, a peer-reviewed medical journal.

60 Minutes reported that Dr. Urschel's addiction clinic sold the Gabasync treatment. However Urschel denied this was a conflict of interest.

Dr. Urschel has also completed a double-blind, placebo controlled study of Gabasync's active ingredients, where 68 patients were randomized to active and 67 patients to placebo treatment for 30 days. The study reported a decrease in both cravings and methamphetamine use following the initial treatment and throughout the 30 days treatment period.

The effects of the flumazenil/gabapentin combination in the treatment of alcohol dependence are less clear. In a randomized, placebo-controlled trial alcohol-dependent subjects taking flumazenil/gabapentin had more abstinent days and time to first heavy drinking if they had high alcohol withdrawal symptoms prior to treatment, whereas the patients with low withdrawal symptoms actually did worse with active treatment.

== Pilot programs ==
A Hythiam press release in 2004 announced that a center in Covington, Louisiana, would offer the treatment that was to become known as Gabasync in that court's drug program. However, the program was never implemented, and the judge there said he was uncomfortable that the evidence for it was not as strong as the company's marketing. As a result, the first Gabasync pilot took place in Gary, Indiana, beginning in November 2005. According to Hythiam the trial was a success and had been adopted, but, according to the Tahoma audit, it was ended early and not adopted. Karen Freeman-Wilson, who had been promoting the Gabasync trial as the CEO of National Association of Drug Court Professionals, later joined the Board of Directors at Hythiam.

Another trial in Fulton County, Georgia, ended early because it was not deemed effective; one report mentioned physician misconduct, but court officials would not comment about the issue.

Pierce County, Washington, initiated a 40-person pilot program in 2006 through a nonprofit treatment center serving the county's drug court, and officials reported very promising results. With this they were able to get $900,000 for Gabasync funding in the state and county budgets for 2007, including a University of Washington study to evaluate the treatment. However, it was subsequently revealed that county executive John Ladenburg, state legislator Dennis Flannigan, and officials at the treatment center had bought Hythiam stock. A county audit also questioned the effectiveness of the program, in part because auditors took a different approach than the treatment center in determining whether Gabasync was successful.

These revelations led the Pierce County Council to suspend its funding for the program in October 2007. An unspent $175,000, along with $400,000 Ladenburg had requested for 2008, were instead set aside with the proviso that they could be used for "evidence-based programs that are directed towards breaking the cycle of drug addiction". Ladenburg and Flannigan also had to amend their state financial disclosure forms, although Ladenburg reported he had sold his stock at a loss and insisted it did not influence his actions. The news from Pierce County, along with a 60 Minutes investigation of Gabasync that aired in December, battered Hythiam's stock, as it fell in value nearly two-thirds by the end of the year. However, at the same time the city council in nearby Federal Way, Washington, approved a small $20,000 Gabasync trial at the suggestion of a city council member whose employee, one of Gabasync's successes, had been treated in Pierce County and featured in the 60 Minutes report.

Also in 2007, Jerry Madden, chair of the Texas House Corrections Committee, secured $2 million of funding over two years in the state budget for Gabasync treatment programs. In contrast with officials in Washington, Madden said he had no financial ties to Hythiam. In support of the budget request he cited a 20-person pilot paid for by Hythiam in Collin County, where the local judge, Charles Sandoval, reported a "spectacular" success rate (even though, when asked, stated that he hadn't kept any records). Other courts in the state were more skeptical about the lack of clinical research supporting Gabasync, however, and only four other counties requested funding. About half of the amount budgeted for the initial year was spent.

== Popular culture connections ==
Despite a ban on marketing of off-label drug use, Hythiam started a national advertising campaign in 2006, utilizing billboards, radio spots, as well as Internet ads and paid search results. In one of the billboard ads the image of Chris Farley (who had died of a drug overdose) was used, which caused significant controversy. Ads with other dead celebrities were planned (according to Hythiam's CEO, Terren Peizer, who has since been indicted for securities fraud relative to another company), but it seems none were actually published.

Actress Lindsay Lohan was connected to Gabasync as one of her rehab efforts during 2007, when Star Magazine reported that she was being treated by Dr. Matthew Torrington, director of the Gabasync Center in Santa Monica. Gabasync was also featured in an episode of the MTV series True Life, in which recovering methamphetamine addict "Dustin" allowed the network to film his treatment with Gabasync, as well as his life before and after he quit using the drug.
