= Cleveland Jewish News =

Weekly Jewish newspaper

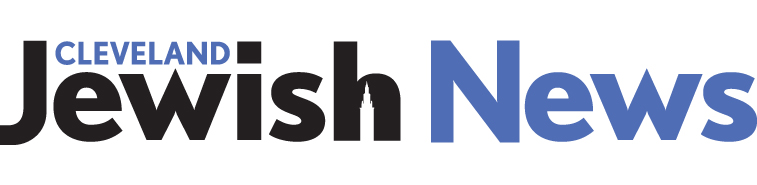
- Cleveland Jewish News logo
- Type: Weekly newspaper
- Owner(s): Cleveland Jewish Publication Co.
- Publisher: Kevin S. Adelstein
- Founded: 1964 (succeeding newspapers established in 1889 and 1906)
- Headquarters: 23880 Commerce Park, Beachwood, Ohio
- Circulation: 12,000
- Price: $53.95 for a one year print subscription
- ISSN: 0009-8825
- Website: cjn.org

The Cleveland Jewish News (the CJN) is a weekly Jewish newspaper headquartered in Beachwood, Ohio, a suburb of Cleveland. The newspaper contains local, national, and international news of Jewish interest.

== History ==
It was formed in 1964. It is a successor to two Cleveland Anglo-Jewish newspapers – The Jewish Independent (established in 1906) and the Jewish Review & Observer (which had as its roots the Hebrew Observer, founded in 1889).

The Cleveland Jewish News had as its first issue a 32-page tabloid on October 30, 1964. Arthur Weyne was its first editor. He was followed by Jerry D. Barach, and then in 1980 by Cynthia Dettelbach, and Michael E. Bennett from 2005 to 2012. Publisher and CEO Kevin S. Adelstein, joined the Cleveland Jewish News in 2013.

From 1989 to 2002, the newspaper was located in Shaker Heights and University Heights. In 2002, it moved to 23880 Commerce Park, Beachwood.

== Today ==
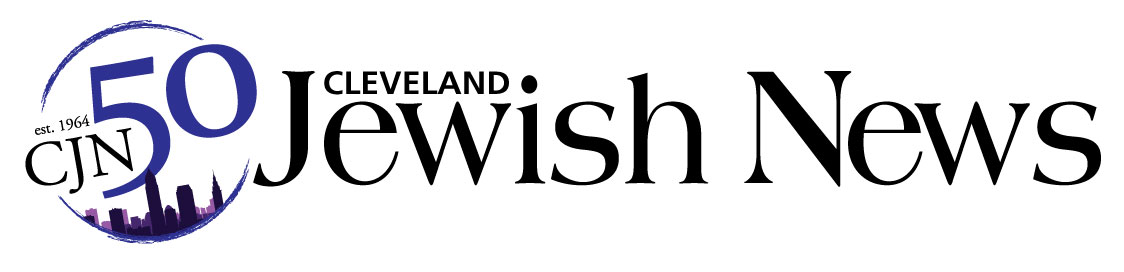
Cleveland Jewish News nameplate including 50th anniversary logo

The Cleveland Jewish News is owned by its parent company, the Cleveland Jewish Publication Company. The CJPC publishes:

- Cleveland Jewish News, a weekly newspaper.
- Columbus Jewish News, a biweekly newspaper.
- Akron Jewish News, a monthly newspaper.
- A website.
- Jstyle, a quarterly magazine covering fashion, food, lifestyles and more.
- Jstyle Weddings, an annual guide.
- The SOURCE: Annual Guide to Jewish Living in Northeast Ohio, a directory of organizations, agencies and businesses.
- Bar•Bat Mitzvah, a biannual magazine.
- Canvas, a bi-annual, digest-sized arts, music, galleries, performance and entertainment magazine.
- Balanced Family, a quarterly magazine covering parenting, aging and family life.

CJN publications have an average print distribution of 8,000 copies and reach more than 45,000 readers in Greater Cleveland. In addition to paid home delivery, the paper is available in libraries and institutions, and single copies are sold at more than 30 newsstands. In 2012, the CJN launched a digital edition of the paper, which is available on Thursday, a day earlier than the print subscription.

In June 2010, the Cleveland Jewish News Foundation launched the CJN Archive: a searchable online database of the complete collection of the Cleveland Jewish News, which has been published weekly since 1964. Before its creation, past CJN editions were available only on more than 200,000 pages of newsprint in large, heavy, bound volumes or on microfilm reels, to which access is limited.

In 2008, the Cleveland Jewish Publication Co. launched LinQ2 Communications, a custom media division. Two of LinQ2's signature publications, Balanced Living and Museum and Galleries of Ohio and Beyond, are found on newsstands and at various locations throughout Ohio. In 2014 the company reverted to using Cleveland Jewish Publication Co. or CJPC as the name of the publishing group.

== See also ==
- Jews and Judaism in Cleveland
