= Richard B. Hollis =

American businessman

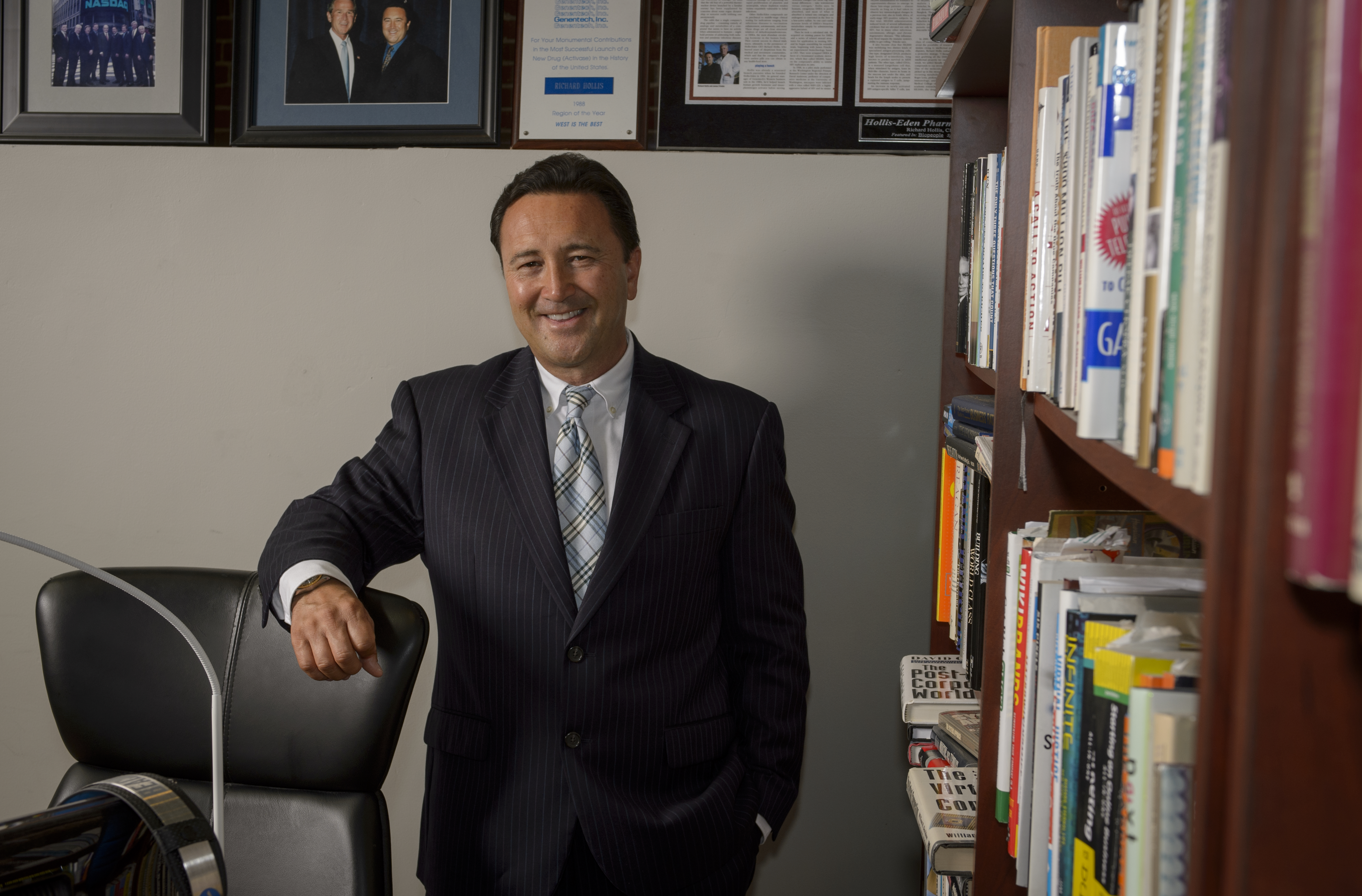
- Born: San Mateo, California, U.S.
- Education: San Francisco State University (B.A.)
- Occupation: Businessman
- Employer(s): Holonis, Inc.
- Title: CEO of Holonis
- Website: www.holonis.com

Richard B. Hollis is an American businessman. He is the founder, chairman, and CEO of Holonis, Inc., a San Diego–based software company. Hollis had previously founded Hollis-Eden Pharmaceuticals, a San Diego–based pharmaceutical company, in 1994.

== Biography ==
Richard Hollis was the fifth of nine children, born to Edward Hollis, a multilingual American military interpreter in the Pacific during World War II, and Grace Borras Hollis. His parents raised their family in San Mateo, California. He graduated from San Francisco State University in 1977 with a degree in psychology.

== Career ==
Hollis began his career in product sales with the healthcare supplier Baxter Travenol (today Baxter International). Subsequently, he was hired by the startup IMED Corporation which had developed intravenous pumps, where he rose from sales to management.

From 1986 to 1990, during the early days of the biotechnology industry, he worked for Genentech and was involved in the product launches for Protropin (human growth hormone) and tissue plasminogen activator (tPA), a drug for dissolving clots in people with strokes or heart attacks. Hollis worked briefly for Instromedix, a medical device company that sold a wearable heart monitor, and in 1991 joined Bioject as executive vice president of marketing and sales. He was made chief operating officer in 1992. As COO he drove a redesign of the company's lead product, the Biojector, a handheld device employing compressed carbon dioxide to shoot vaccines through the skin.

Hollis founded Hollis-Eden Pharmaceuticals, Inc. in 1994 and took it public in 1997 through a reverse merger, serving as founder, chairman, and chief executive officer. The company licensed some of its founding technology from Patrick Prendergast, an Irish scientist who became CSO; the "Eden" portion of the company name was derived from Prendergast's research facility, Edenland.

At its founding, Hollis focused the company on immune modulation as a strategy and identified analogs of dehydroepiandrosterone (DHEA), as promising drug candidates; the initial indications for these drug candidates were infectious diseases, especially those caused by hepatitis and HIV, and malaria. In 1999 Hollis-Eden licensed intellectual property from Roger Loria, a professor at Virginia Commonwealth University, that covered the DHEA analog drug candidate 5-Androstenediol that was later called Neumune. These compounds turned out to have the ability to regulate the immune system and to drive the body to make more blood cells and proved promising in models of radiation poisoning. As a result, the company began to pursue that indication as well. The shift to radiation poisoning was driven partly by pressures in the HIV market to make drugs available more cheaply, making the antiviral business less attractive. However, questions of how to test drugs for radiation poisoning in humans, how to deal with the FDA, and who would buy the drug, were all unclear at that time.

The US government had a biological defense program since the 1950s, but after the 9/11 terrorist attacks in the US, it began investing more heavily, culminating in the 2004 passage of the Project Bioshield Act. Hollis personally lobbied the NIH, Congress, and the president to get the bill passed and to have the government fund development of Neumune and agree to stockpile it. As part of that effort he made many media appearances one on 60 Minutes. His lobbying and media appearances turned to fierce criticism of the government in 2007 when Neumune was dropped from Project Bioshield, leaving Hollis-Eden's business without funding or a market, and causing its shares to lose a third of their value; the company cut 20% of its workforce soon after.

Hollis was fired for cause by the company in 2009; the cause was not disclosed. Terren Peizer, its president from 1997 to 1999, resigned from the company concurrently. The New York Times had covered the company and their involvement in it in an article entitled: "No Sales, but Watch the Stock Soar". By 1998 the company still had no sales or earnings. By September 1999 the company's stock was at $13.50, 47% lower than its 52-week high.

The company was renamed Harbor Biosciences in 2010.

In 2010 Hollis formed a new company, Holonis, with a group of younger internet entrepreneurs. It built an integrated web and social media communications platform for small and medium-sized businesses intended to make a business' entire digital marketing and analytics effort more simple. They launched the platform at the 2015 South by Southwest Festival in Austin, Texas.
