= Maltz Museum =

Jewish history museum in Cleveland, Ohio

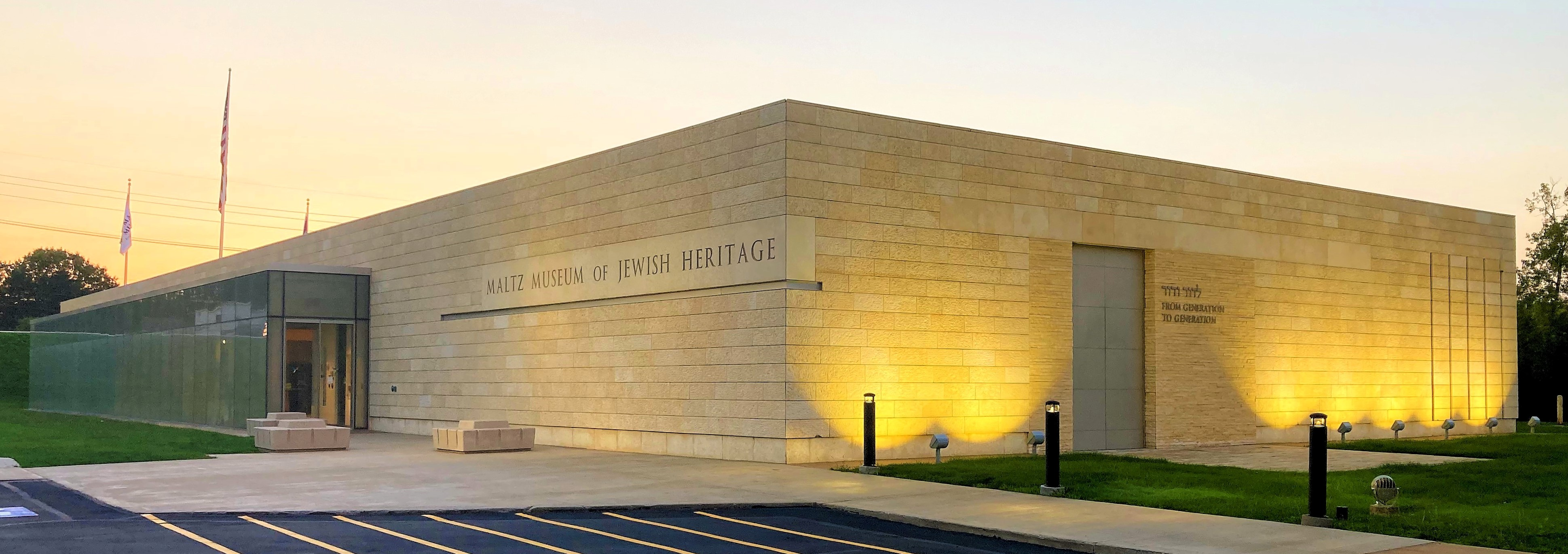
- Established: November 15, 2005
- Location: Beachwood, Ohio, U.S.
- Coordinates: 41.47664°N 81.496835°W
- Website: www.maltzmuseum.org

The Maltz Museum is a private non-profit museum in the Cleveland suburb of Beachwood that opened in 2005. The museum celebrates the history of the Jewish community of Greater Cleveland and Northeast Ohio, as well as the diversity of the human experience, with a focus on tolerance.

Co-founder Milton Maltz’s company, The Malrite Company, was the lead developer. Malrite focuses on the development of innovative museum projects around the country, including the International Spy Museum in Washington, D.C.

The building's exterior brickwork is made of Jerusalem gold limestone which was sourced from Israel.

== Exhibits ==
=== Permanent collections ===
The Maltz Museum features two permanent collections and hosts rotating exhibitions (traveling and original), as well as weekly public programs.

An American Story chronicles the challenges and celebrates the achievements of generations of men, women and children in Cleveland and Northeast Ohio's Jewish communities, from the original 19th-century European settlers to the individuals who today call the region home.

The Temple - Tifereth Israel Gallery showcases artifacts that embody Jewish tradition and ritual, but they also highlight the links between Judaism and other faiths. The gallery features 175 treasures from The Temple-Tifereth Israel’s extensive collection of Jewish ritual objects and fine arts.

=== Special exhibitions ===
A 4,000-square-foot (370 m^{2}) special exhibition gallery regularly features changing exhibitions of national and international prominence, including:

- The Jewish Journey: Frederic Brenner's Photographic Odyssey, October 2005 - January 8, 2006, 115 photographs highlighting the diversity of the Jewish people worldwide.
- Deadly Medicine: Creating The Master Race from the United States Holocaust Memorial Museum, and Where Would You Draw The Line?, created by the Maltz Museum, September 25, 2007 - January 20, 2008. Deadly Medicine is an exhibition on Nazi eugenics featuring photographs, graphic reproductions, actual artifacts, film footage, eyewitness accounts and survivor testimonies. Where Would You Draw The Line was a series of seven current-day medical ethics questions, voted on by more than 5,000 visitors to the Museum and online.
- Zap! Pow! Bam! The Superhero, The Golden Age of Comics, from the Breman Museum in Atlanta, September 2008 - January 25, 2009, a look at the superhero genre through vintage artwork, rare early comics, scripts, multi-media presentations, original toys and games, with a focus on Superman, the original superhero, created by Clevelanders.
- The Nazi Olympics Berlin 1936, October 19, 2010 - January 23, 2011, produced by the United States Holocaust Memorial Museum, a look at how world politics, sports, and racism converged in Germany. Explores the issues surrounding the 1936 Olympic Games — the Nazis' use of propaganda, the intense boycott debate, the history of the torch run, the historic performance of Jesse Owens, and more.
- Violins of Hope, was on view from October 2, 2015 - January 3, 2016. The exhibition, created by the Maltz Museum, featured violins that survived the Holocaust and were restored by Amnon Weinstein. The instruments were frequently removed from their cases during the course of the exhibition and played. The multimedia exhibition co-curated by James Grymes, professor of musicology at the University of North Carolina-Charlotte and author of the book, Violins of Hope: Violins of the Holocaust—Instruments of Hope and Liberation in Mankind’s Darkest Hour, illustrated both the strength of the human spirit and the power of music. It is part of Violins of Hope Cleveland, a community-wide collaboration that aims to inform, educate and inspire through a diverse range of performances, lectures, an exhibition and other public programming. Violins of Hope Cleveland partners are The Cleveland Orchestra, Case Western Reserve, the Cleveland Institute of Music, Facing History and Ourselves, ideastream, the Jewish Federation of Cleveland, and the Maltz Museum of Jewish Heritage.
- Operation Finale: The Capture & Trial of Adolf Eichmann, was on view from February 18, 2016 - July 24, 2016. The world premiere exhibition used photographs, film and recently declassified spy artifacts to tell the secret history behind the daring abduction and globally broadcast trial of a principal perpetrator of the Final Solution. The exhibition — which was extended due to its popularity — was a co-production of Beit Hatfutsot – The Museum of the Jewish People, Tel Aviv, Israel; The Mossad – Israeli Secret Intelligence Service and the Maltz Museum of Jewish Heritage.

== Survivor talks ==
The Museum maintains a special focus on remembrance of one of the darkest periods in human history. The rise of the Nazi regime in Germany and its subsequent acts of genocide against Jews, Roma and many others in Europe represented an unparalleled act of criminality that today is nonetheless in danger of being forgotten or denied outright. The Museum commemorates those events through artifacts and images and through the voices of men and women who survived the nightmare and share their stories of fortitude and heroism with students.

== School tours ==
Each year the Maltz Museum welcomes more than 7,000 K–12 students from public, private, parochial, home and charter schools. Some 40 percent of student visitors receive free transportation based on need, and Cleveland Metropolitan School District students also receive free admission.

== Notable programs ==
Stop the Hate® - Stop the Hate® celebrates 6–12th graders across 12 counties of Northeast Ohio who take action to create a more accepting and inclusive society. The Maltz Museum initiative challenges young people to consider the impact of intolerance and the role of the individual in effecting change. By encouraging students to be leaders and upstanders, Stop the Hate® reflects the Jewish values of responsible citizenship and respect for all humanity. Since Stop the Hate® was introduced eight years ago, more than 20,000 6–12th graders have used their voices to take a stand against discrimination and indifference in their communities. In recognition of their efforts, the Maltz Museum of Jewish Heritage has awarded $800,000 in academic scholarships and programmatic anti-bias grants.

Begin the Conversation - In promoting a more inclusive society and encouraging connection, the Museum serves as a cultural hub – a venue for people of all faiths and backgrounds to meet and explore their differences and the common values they share. “Begin the Conversation,” a series inaugurated in 2014, stimulates just such communication through programs that foster dialogue on contemporary issues, with guest speakers, film screenings, staged readings of dramatic works and musical performances. Programs center on themes ranging from Arab-American heritage and LGBTQ issues to interfaith discussions, or respond to global current events. The goal of these events is to present new points of view for audiences to consider – to provide an opportunity to listen, to question and to begin to understand different attitudes and opinions.

Jewish American Heritage Month - Jewish American Heritage Month Ceremony at Cleveland City Hall - a now annual event that commenced in May 2010 and featured remarks from Mayor Frank G. Jackson and recognition of early Jewish city councilmen in Cleveland.

Jesse Owens Way Street Dedication - on November 15, 2010, in connection with the exhibition The Nazi Olympics Berlin 1936, East Roadway in Downtown Cleveland (near Public Square) was dedicated to Jesse Owens.

== See also ==
- Jews and Judaism in Cleveland
