= Terren Peizer =

American investment manager

- Born: Terren Scott Peizer; July 31, 1959 (age 67); Beachwood, Ohio, U.S.
- Education: University of Pennsylvania (BS)
- Years active: 1983–present
- Criminal charges: Convicted of insider trading (two counts) and securities fraud (2024)
- Criminal penalty: 42 months in prison and fined $5.25 million. Subsequently pardoned by President Trump in January 2026
- Criminal status: Pardoned

Terren Scott Peizer (born July 31, 1959) is an American businessperson who was convicted of insider trading and securities fraud. He worked as a junk bond salesman at Drexel Burnham Lambert. He testified against his former boss Mike Milken in 1990 in Milken's securities fraud prosecution in exchange for immunity from both criminal prosecution and SEC sanctions. In the decades that followed, Peizer was an investor, manager, and owner of a series of small-cap companies in various industries, several of which lost money, lost stock value, or went bankrupt during or shortly after his involvement.

Peizer was founder, CEO, and chairman of Ontrak Inc., a publicly traded healthcare company, from which he resigned in March 2023 after U.S. authorities charged him with insider trading and securities fraud. At the conclusion of a nine-day trial in June 2024, a California federal jury found him guilty of three counts of insider trading and securities fraud. Peizer was sentenced to 42 months in prison, fined $5.25 million and ordered forfeit more than $12.7 million in ill-gotten gains. On January 16, 2026, President Donald Trump gave a full and unconditional pardon to Peizer.

== Early life and education ==
Peizer's hometown is Beachwood, Ohio. He attended Beachwood High School. Peizer graduated with an undergraduate B.S. in Economics from the Wharton School of the University of Pennsylvania. He resides in Dorado, Puerto Rico and Santa Monica, California.

== Career ==
=== Drexel Burnham Lambert, and immunity to testify against Milken ===
Out of college in 1983, Peizer worked for a few months at Goldman Sachs when he was 21 years old. Later that year he worked for a stint at First Boston as a high yield bond salesman.

Michael Milken hired Peizer as a junk bond salesman at Drexel Burnham Lambert in 1985. His job was to manage the Drexel account of the president of high-yield mutual fund manager Solomon Asset Management, with whom Drexel had an illegal arrangement that included insider trading and phony tax losses. Peizer worked directly under (and at the same desk as) Milken and admired him, sometimes pretending to be him on the phone, and calling him "Dad".

When investigations into Milken's illegal activities began, Peizer, starting in 1988, provided material evidence to prosecutors against Milken and Solomon. At Milken's pre-sentencing hearing for securities fraud in 1990, Peizer testified against Milken in exchange for immunity from both criminal prosecution and SEC sanctions. Milken pled guilty and served nearly two years in prison.

=== Investor and executive in small-cap companies ===
==== 1989–2000 ====
After Drexel, Peizer became a private investor in a series of small companies. In 1989, Peizer purchased the Omaha Racers, a minor league basketball team, but it struggled financially. He sold the team the following year.

In 1991, he gained control of plastics company UTI Chemicals Inc., which had 26 employees, and became its president for a salary of $100,000; the company had a loss of over three million dollars each of the following two years. He stepped down as its chairman in 1994.

In June 1991, Peizer purchased $3.5 million of convertible debentures from Candies, Inc. (formerly known as Millfeld Trading Co.; a shoe importing and marketing business), and became a director of the company. He had by that time already purchased 135,000 shares of the company's common stock, and when he became a director he received warrants to purchase 1.1 million shares of the company's common stock at $10.00 per share. Peizer divested himself of over 90% of his stock in the company on September 23, 1991, one day before the company publicly acknowledged that it had materially underpaid its customs obligations and faced a $1.6 million liability. In early 1992, the price of the company stock collapsed after the company disclosed that it was being investigated by federal prosecutors for systematic underpayment of its customs duties, and Peizer thereafter resigned as a director.

Peizer purchased an interest of over 50% in Urethane Technologies, a small-cap company which manufactured and sold a bicycle tire that it claimed would not go flat, and named himself Chairman. He sold his shares in 1993 at what was reported to be a $6 million profit, and the company never delivered, lost money, and went bankrupt in 1997.

In 1993, he acquired a 37% share of now-defunct computer parts producer CMS Enhancements. He was elected chairman of the company, and held the position for two years.

In the mid-1990s, Peizer played a role in now-defunct Towers Financial Corporation. The company was a debt collection agency Ponzi scheme founded by fraudster Steven Hoffenberg, with which Jeffrey Epstein was involved.

Peizer purchased an interest in Advanced Promotion Technologies, which manufactured electronic barcode coupon machines for checkout lines. He subsequently sold his shares, and the company then went bankrupt in 1996.

From 1997 to 1999, Peizer was president of Hollis-Eden, a startup pharmaceutical company. The New York Times covered the company and his involvement in it in an article entitled: "No Sales, but Watch the Stock Soar". By 1998 the company still had no sales or earnings. That year Peizer said: "This is a once in a lifetime opportunity for me. We have something special." Peizer resigned from the company in March 1999 concurrently with the dismissal of its CEO Richard B. Hollis for cause. By September 1999 the company's stock was at $13.50, 47% lower than its 52-week high.

In 1999, Peizer raised money for and invested in Tera Computer Company, an unprofitable 112-employee manufacturer of supercomputers. The money that was raised allowed Tera to later buy the remains of Cray Research, and Peizer was its chairman and a director from 1999 to 2000. He stepped down as chairman in 2000. Tera said the reason was that Peizer would otherwise have been required to obtain a security clearance from the US Department of Defense by the end of 2000 to transfer Cray's classified government business to Tera by then, and Tera did not think that would happen.

==== 2001–present ====
In 2004, Peizer founded Hythiam Inc., a tiny pharmaceutical company, from which in 2006 when he was majority shareholder he received $1.3 million in compensation. The firm bought the rights to an ineffective addiction treatment, and marketed it. Despite the fact that no placebo-controlled or double-blind study or peer-reviewed publication of its "Prometa" (the marketing name for Gabasync) approach had been undertaken, and although no FDA approval had been obtained, Hythiam advertised the "innovative, medically based treatment" (which could cost $15,000 per patient) and franchised doctors to use Prometa, in exchange for a per-patient fee. Barrons, in a November 2005 article entitled "Curb Your Cravings For This Stock", wrote "If the venture works out for patients and the investing public, it'll be a rare success for Peizer, who's promoted a series of disappointing small-cap medical or technology stocks ... since his days at Drexel". Peizer said: "Hythiam is my biggest triumph. If it's the only thing I did, then my life would have been a tremendous success." Journalist Scott Pelley said to him in 2007: "Depending on who you talk to, you're either a revolutionary or a snake oil salesman." 60 Minutes, NBC News, and The Dallas Morning News criticized Peizer after the company bypassed clinical studies and government approval when bringing to market Prometa; the addiction drug proved to be completely ineffective. Journalist Adam Feuerstein opined: "most of what Peizer says is dubious-sounding hype". In June 2008, Hythiam had generated a net loss each year for 5 straight years, and while its stock had traded at $61.26 a share in 2007, it traded at $0.18 per share three years later (a 99.7% drop). According to independent investment research firm Morningstar: "Over the long haul, this company has posted some of its industry's worst returns on assets."

In 2018, Peizer became CEO and chairman of BioVie, a pharmaceutical company of which he was majority shareholder (his ownership was 88% as of June 2021). In 2021 the company entered into an agreement to buy a product from another company he controlled, NeurMedix, for up to $10 million and over 8 million BioVie shares; that led to a 15% share price drop in one day to $18.30 a share, and in April 2023 the company's share price was down to $8.08. He resigned on March 2, 2023, the day after he was criminally indicted, at which point the company had not yet received any revenue, and had lost $26 million in 2022.

In March 2021, Peizer became the controlling shareholder and board Executive Chairman of EVmo, a technology-enabled fleet management and rental company, which had a share price of $5.45 the prior month. He resigned as EVmo Chairman on February 17, 2023, as the company defaulted on a $7.5 million loan, and its stock price had declined to $0.17 per share.

He is the founder and CEO of Acuitas Group Holdings (of which he is the sole shareholder), biotech company NeurMedix (of which he was the sole shareholder, and which in 2021 made a multi-million dollar sale to BioVie, of which Peizer was CEO), and blockchain company Casperlabs.

=== Ontrak: indictment and conviction ===
Until his 2023 indictment, he was CEO and chairman of Catasys, Inc. (later renamed Ontrak Inc.), a publicly traded healthcare company that he had founded in 2003. Peizer was also Ontrak’s biggest shareholder. His 2018 compensation at the company was $2.4 million, over twice that of CEOs of similar companies.

On March 1, 2023, after an FBI investigation, Peizer was charged with insider trading by the SEC, which alleged that he sold $20 million of Ontrak Inc. stock in 2021 while he was in possession of material nonpublic negative information related to the company's largest customer. Ontrak shares, which had traded at $85.21 in February 2021, were trading at under $1.00 since July 2022. In addition, the U.S. Department of Justice announced criminal charges of insider trading and securities fraud against Peizer, charging that thereby he had avoided $12 million in losses; Peizer was arrested. His case was assigned to the U.S. District Court for the Central District of California, before U.S. District Judge Dale S. Fischer.

On March 2, 2023, he resigned as Ontrak CEO and Chairman. On January 31, 2024, a superseding indictment was filed, charging Peizer with additional counts of securities fraud and insider trading. On February 9, 2024, Peizer moved to dismiss the indictment. On March 7, 2024, Judge Fischer denied Peizer’s motion to dismiss, holding that the government had alleged facts sufficient to give rise to a charge of insider trading. Trial was set for June 4, 2024.

On June 21, 2024, he was convicted and found guilty by a Los Angeles, California, federal jury of three counts of insider trading and securities fraud, following a nine-day trial. Peizer was slated to be sentenced on October 21, 2024. On August 14, 2024, Peizer filed a motion for an acquittal and a motion for a new trial, with a hearing set for October 21, 2024. His sentencing hearing is set for June 23, 2025. Peizer could face a maximum penalty of 65 years in prison.

On June 23, 2025, he was sentenced to 42 months in prison for insider trading by Judge Fischer, and ordered to pay a fine of $5.25 million and forfeit over $12.7 million in ill-gotten gains.

On January 16, 2026, President Donald Trump gave Peizer a full and unconditional pardon.

== See also ==
- List of people granted executive clemency in the second Trump presidency
