= Fuchs Mizrachi School =

Location
- 26600 Shaker Blvd; Beachwood, Ohio 44122; United States; 41.4771°N 81.4904°W

Information
- Type: Private school
- Motto: "It's more than a school, it's a community"
- Religious affiliation: Modern Orthodox Jewish
- Established: 1983
- Head of school: Avery Joel
- Grades: PK–12
- Enrollment: 424, including 42 PK students (2017–18)
- Colors: Blue and white
- Team name: Mayhem
- Website: www.fuchsmizrachi.org

Fuchs Mizrachi School is a Jewish, Modern Orthodox private school in Beachwood, Ohio, founded in 1983. The school has over 500 students from pre-kindergarten through twelfth grade. In 1993, students and faculty protested in front of the home of a Ukrainian guard at several Nazi concentration camps. In 2005, an inner-city basketball coach came out of retirement to coach the school's non-league sports team.

== History ==
Fuchs Mizrachi was founded in 1983 by Leonard Fuchs and his family, opening under the name "Bet Sefer Mizrachi", "Bet Sefer" being the Hebrew word for "school" and "Mizrachi" being a religious Zionist organization. It originally operated out of the Taylor Road Synagogue with 18 students. In 1987, the school moved into a building formerly occupied by Northwood Elementary School, but the constraints of the building meant that the school used a separate building for their early childhood program.

In 1993, students and faculty from Fuchs Mizrachi participated in a protest in front of the house of John Demjanjuk, a Ukrainian guard at Nazi concentration camps who had flown to the United States after being released from Israeli prison. The protesters, who were staging a vigil, objected to Demjanjuk's release and his living in the United States. One student, a fifteen year old named David Pollack, told The Fremont News-Messenger that it was immoral "that a murderer like Demjanjuk should be let into this country and have the benefits of living in this country". Another tenth grader named Devorah Pomerantz, as well as a rabbi at the school named Samuel Levine, told The Cincinnati Enquirer that this was important to keep the memory of the Holocaust alive and pass the story on to the next generation.

In 1999, the school was given its name of Fuchs Mizrachi in recognizing a donation from Leonard and Susan Fuchs. In 2010, Fuchs Mizrachi moved both the early childhood program and the rest of the school into a new campus, naming it after Irving Stone and his wife Beatrice. The vacated building would be acquired by the city of University Heights for $600,000. In 2020, Fuchs Mizrachi stopped in-person classes when a visitor was diagnosed with COVID-19.

== Demographics and curriculum ==
Fuchs Mizrachi adheres to Modern Orthodox Judaism. In the 2017–2018 school year, there were 424 students from pre-kindergarten through twelfth grade. Of the 382 students enrolled in or after kindergarten, 376 of those students were white, while 6 were black, and 7 children preferred to not say. As of the 2024-2025 school year, 588 students were enrolled. Students at Fuchs Mizrachi take a dual curriculum of courses, which include normal high school courses as well as courses covering the Talmud, the Torah, and Modern Hebrew.

== Divisions ==
- Early Childhood Program
- Lower School (grades 1-5)
- Junior High School (grades 6-8)
- Stark High School (grades 9-12)

== Sports ==
In 2004, high school basketball coach Walter Killian came out of retirement to coach for the Fuchs Mizrachi Mayhem basketball team. Killian, a 67 year old African American Baptist, had worked mostly in inner city Cleveland and had not coached a mostly white team before. The Mayhem's athletic record saw improvement under Killian, going from 12–15 in 2004 to 10–4 during his tenure. Taking the job was described by the Associated Press as "a step down" for Killian, as he had previously coached for teams in the Lake Erie League, whereas Fuchs Mizrachi was a non-league school at the time. Killian remained with the team until 2006.

Students on Fuchs Mizrachi's basketball team do not practice or play organized basketball from Friday until nightfall Saturday, in observance of Shabbat.
