= Beachwood High School =

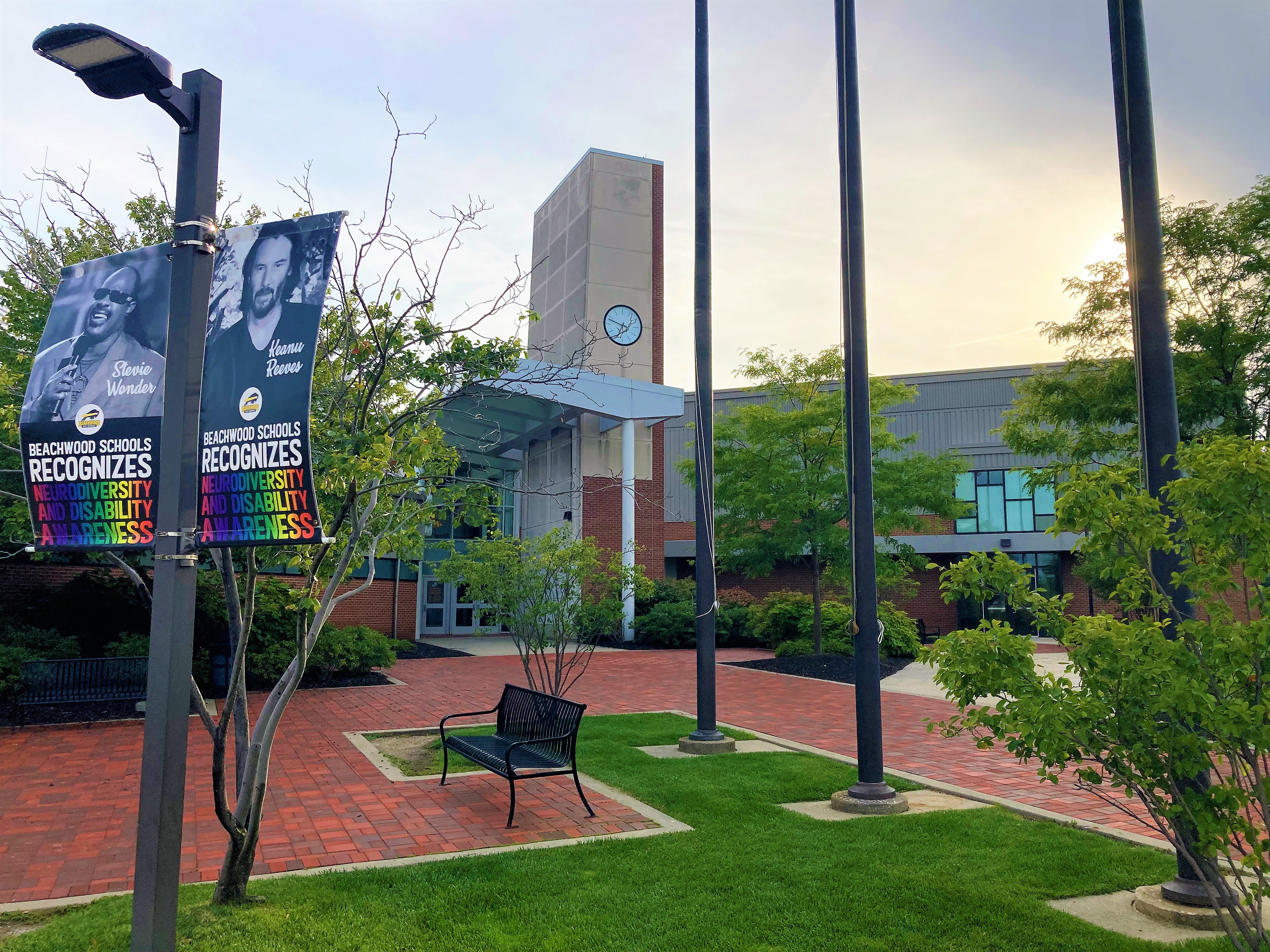

Location
- 25100 Fairmount Boulevard; Beachwood, (Cuyahoga County), Ohio 44122; United States; 41.4841°N 81.5019°W

Information
- Type: Public, Coeducational high school
- School district: Beachwood City Schools
- Superintendent: Robert Hardis
- CEEB code: 361193
- Principal: Rebekah Sharpe
- Staff: 40.00 (FTE)
- Grades: 9-12
- Enrollment: 586 (2023–2024)
- Student to teacher ratio: 14.65
- Colors: White and Gold
- Athletics conference: Chagrin Valley Conference
- Nickname: The Wood
- Team name: Bison
- Rival: Orange High School (Ohio)
- Newspaper: The Beachcomber
- Website: https://www.beachwoodschools.org/BHS.aspx

Beachwood High School is a four-year college preparatory public high school located in Beachwood, Ohio, a suburb of Cleveland. It is part of the Beachwood City School District. Athletic teams are known as the Bison, and they compete in the Ohio High School Athletic Association as a member of the Chagrin Valley Conference.

== Recognition ==
Beachwood has earned three U.S. Department of Education Blue Ribbon Awards, the highest rating of Excellent from the State of Ohio Department of Education, membership in the Ohio Department of Education "Schools to Watch," a National 21st Century School of Distinction Award for Technology Excellence, induction in the Ohio Association of Elementary School Administrators Hall of Fame, two Excellence in School Management Awards from the Harvard Business School Club, and national recognition as among the Top 100 in Music Education from the American Music Conference.

== Athletics ==
=== State championships ===
- Boys wrestling - 2026
- Girls track and field - 2017, 2018, 2026

== Notable alumni and faculty ==
- Chad Bronstein - co-founder and CEO of Real American Freestyle
- Armond Budish - politician and lawyer
- Marc Cohn - singer-songwriter and musician
- Jennifer Eberhardt - social psychology professor
- Alan Fried - colligate wrestler
- Dan Friedman - graphic designer
- Brad Goldberg - Major League Baseball pitcher and coach
- Jonathan Goldstein - screenwriter, television writer and producer, and film director
- Jonah Koslen - singer-songwriter and musician
- Josh Mandel - politician
- Terren Peizer - businessperson, convicted of insider trading and securities fraud
- Kahlil Seren - politician
- Tina Tchen - lawyer and President Barack Obama Administration official
- Alex Wyse - actor, writer, director, and producer
