= Oheb Zedek Cedar Sinai Synagogue =

Modern Orthodox synagogue in Ohio

- Location in Cleveland

Religion
- Affiliation: Modern Orthodox Judaism
- Ecclesiastical or organizational status: Synagogue
- Leadership: Rabbi Noah Leavitt
- Status: Active

Location
- Location: 23749 Cedar Road, Lyndhurst, Cleveland, Ohio 44122
- Country: United States
- Interactive map of Oheb Zedek Cedar Sinai Synagogue
- Coordinates: 41°30′06″N 81°30′37″W

Architecture
- Established: 2012 (merged congregation): from 1887 (Oheb Zedek); from 1899 (Cedar Sinai)
- Completed: Oheb Zedek: 1905 (Cleveland); 1922 (Glenville); 1955 (Cleveland Heights); Cedar Sinai: 1914 (Cleveland); 1927 (Glenville); 1932 (Mount Pleasant); 1957 (South Euclid); c. 2000 (Lyndhurst)

Website
- ohebzedekcedarsinaisynagogue.shulcloud.com

The Oheb Zedek Cedar Sinai Synagogue is a Modern Orthodox Jewish synagogue located at 23749 Cedar Road, in Lyndhurst, an eastern suburb of Cleveland, Ohio, in the United States. The congregation was formed in 2012, through a merger of two congregations dating from 1887.

== History ==
=== Oheb Zedek ===
The Oheb Zedek congregation has its roots from 1887 that subsequently incorporated five other small to medium-sized Modern Orthodox congregations in the early 1950s.

Founded in 1904, the Oheb Zedek congregation purchased property at East 38th and Scovill Streets, and completed construction of a synagogue in September 1905. By 1915 the congregation operated a branch in Glenville. A new synagogue was dedicated at Parkwood and Morrison streets, Glenville in August 1922. In 1952 Oheb Zedek merged with the Chibas Jerusalem congregation, established in 1904; Oheb Zedek having established a branch in rented premises on Taylor Road, Cleveland Heights in 1949. Between 1953 and 1955, the Cleveland Heights branch congregation merged with the congregations of Knesseth Israel (established in 1887), Agudath Achim (established in 1891), Shaaray Torah (established in 1897), and Agudath B'nai Israel Anshe Sfard (established in 1914).

In 1955, Oheb Zedek-Taylor Road Synagogue relocated to 1970 South Taylor Road in Cleveland Heights.

=== Cedar Sinai ===
The Cedar Sinai congregation has its roots from 1899 that subsequently incorporated ten other small to medium-sized Orthodox congregations during the mid-to-late 1950s, 1970s, and in 2012.

The Warrensville Center congregation was formed in 1959 through the mergers of Tetiever Ahavath Achim Anshe Sfard Congregation (established in 1909), and Congregation Nvoh Tzedick (established in 1918), and Kinsman Jewish Center (established in 1930 as B'nai Jacob Kol Israel Congregation). Upon the merger, the new Warrensville Center congregation occupied the synagogue completed in 1957 by the Tetiever congregation on Warrensville Center Road, in South Euclid. Merged in 1962 as the Sherith Jacob Israel congregation, Sherith Jacob (established in 1899) and Sherith Israel (established in 1922) agree, in 1970, to merge into the Warrensville Center congregation, with the congregations establishing synagogues in Cleveland, Glenville, and Mount Pleasant.

In 1972, the Shaker-Lee congregation merged into the Warrensville Center congregation. Shaker-Lee itself was formed in 1959 through a merger of the congregations of Ohel Jacob (established in 1915) and Ohel Yavne (established in 1919). The name of the congregation stems from its location on Lee Road in Shaker Heights, erected by Ohel Jacob in 1956. In 1962 the Tifereth Israel congregation (established in 1920) joined Shaker-Lee.

In the early-2000s, the congregation moved from Warrensville Road to Cedar Road in Lyndhurst and, in 2012, the Sinai congregation merged with the Cedar Road congregation to create the Cedar Sinai congregation.

=== Legal action ===
Following announcement of the merger, in January 2013 members of Oheb Zedek-Taylor Road congregation began legal action again the merged congregation's board of trustees and three of its own board members in a bid to keep the Cleveland Heights synagogue open. The matter was referred to the Beth Din of America for determination. However, the parties settled on confidential terms in April 2014 that resulted in the Taylor Road Synagogue remaining open as an independent entity. As of 2023 the Taylor Road congregation meets without a rabbi.
