= Beachwood, Ohio =

- City
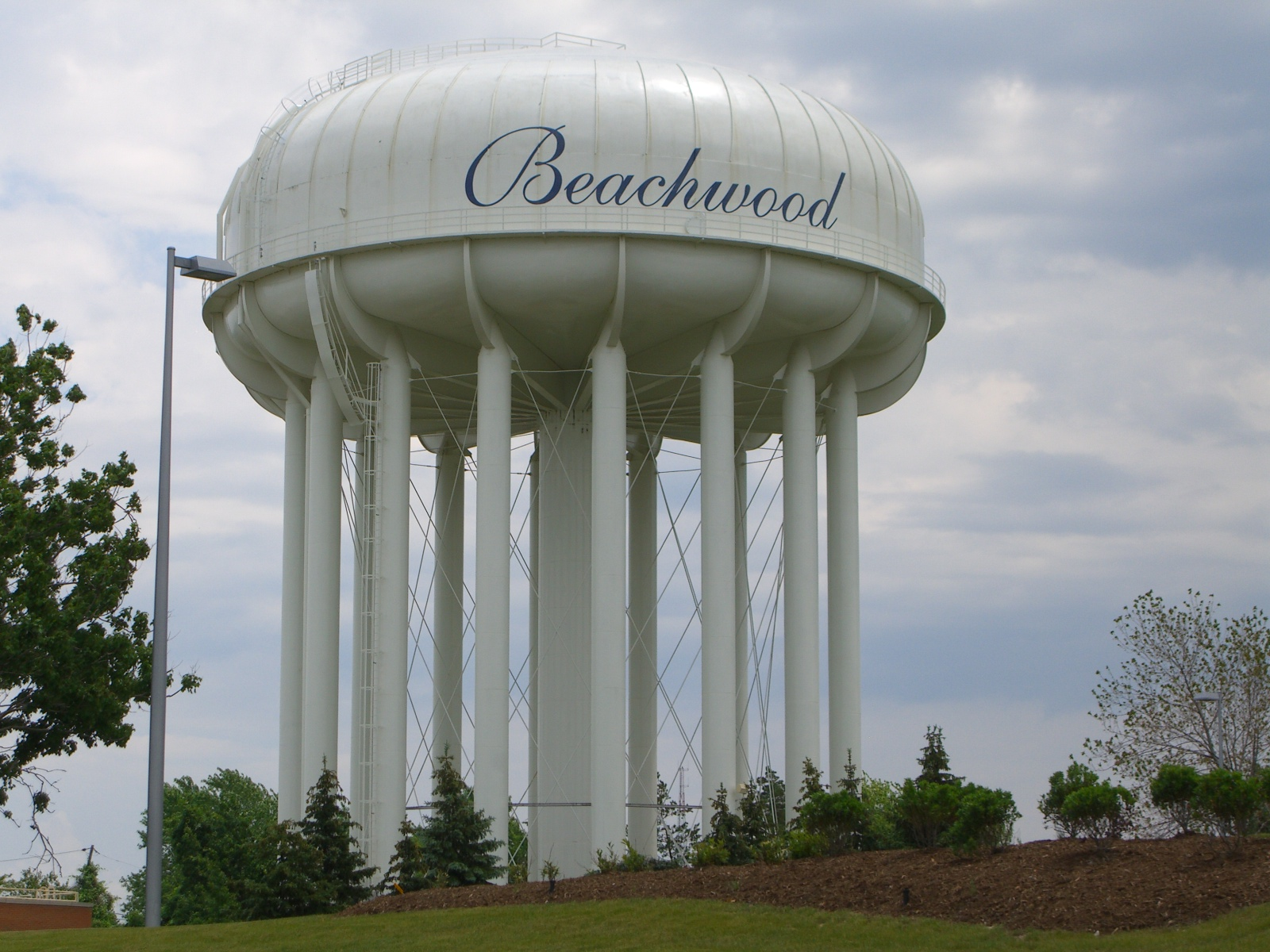
- Beachwood water tower
- Interactive map of Beachwood, Ohio
- Location within Ohio Location within the United States
- Coordinates: 41°28′56″N 81°30′14″W
- Country: United States
- State: Ohio
- County: Cuyahoga

Government
  - Mayor: Justin Berns (D)

Area
  - Total: 5.27 sq mi (13.65 km^{2})
  - Land: 5.26 sq mi (13.63 km^{2})
  - Water: 0.0077 sq mi (0.02 km^{2})
- Elevation: 1,214 ft (370 m)

Population (2020)
  - Total: 14,040
  - Estimate (2023): 13,734
  - Density: 2,667.3/sq mi (1,029.84/km^{2})
- Time zone: UTC-5 (Eastern (EST))
  - Summer (DST): UTC-4 (EDT)
- ZIP code: 44122
- Area code: 216
- FIPS code: 39-04500
- GNIS feature ID: 1085950
- Website: www.beachwoodohio.com

Beachwood is a city in eastern Cuyahoga County, Ohio, United States. The population was 14,040 at the 2020 census. A suburb of Cleveland, it is part of the Cleveland metropolitan area.

== History ==
The land that eventually became Beachwood was originally part of the Connecticut Western Reserve. Before becoming an independent municipality, Beachwood was part of Warrensville Township. In 1915, it seceded from Warrensville after the Township voted to close a nearby area school. A petition was organized, and on June 26, 1915, Beachwood was incorporated into an independent village. In 1960, Beachwood had reached the number of residents to attain city status under the Ohio Revised Code.

Beachwood was named for the numerous beech trees that grew throughout the village. The origin of the spelling of the city is disputed. Upon incorporation, the city's name was originally spelled "Beechwood". One popular theory is that an early village hall clerk misspelled the name on some official documents, giving rise to the current spelling.

In 1948, a village-wide debate was sparked by the proposal to construct the Anshe Chesed Fairmount Temple following the purchase of 32 acres of land on which the temple currently stands. The debate started due to the growing trend of families moving to the suburbs due to the booming post-WWII economy. Considering that Beachwood at the time was a small community with few Jews, the sudden proposal of the large synagogue of 1,800 families sparked antisemitic worries among the village populace due to the imminent demographics change which the establishment of a large synagogue would bring. The village council, no member of which was Jewish, cited in 1952 that the establishment of Anshe Chesed "would be detrimental to the public safety, welfare, and convenience of the village". One morning in May 1952, following Anshe Chesed's threat to sue the village of Beachwood, residents opened their mailboxes and found a white supremacist newspaper called The Plain Truth, with the message:

The battle is on. No longer should we sit idly by and watch our country be taken from us. Act now. Let not the Jew plan succeed.

Zoning arguments between the village and the congregation regarding the temple's construction led to the Ohio Supreme Court ruling in 1954 that the synagogue must be allowed to be built, as well as issuing state building permits to the congregation. The temple's construction was finished in 1957. On June 18, 2024, the city of Beachwood agreed to purchase the Anshe Chesed Fairmount Temple for eight million dollars, following Anshe's Chessed's merger with Temple-Tifereth Israel, to become Congregation Mishkan Or.

Since the late 1950s, multiple other synagogues relocated to Beachwood, establishing the Jewish influence on the growth of the community.

== Geography ==
According to the United States Census Bureau, the city has a total area of 5.34 square miles (13.83 km^{2}), of which 5.33 square miles (13.80 km^{2}) is land and 0.01 square miles (0.03 km^{2}) is water.

== Demographics ==
Historical population
Census	Pop.	Note	%±
1920	225		—
1930	249		10.7%
1940	372		49.4%
1950	1,073		188.4%
1960	6,089		467.5%
1970	9,631		58.2%
1980	9,983		3.7%
1990	10,677		7.0%
2000	12,186		14.1%
2010	11,953		−1.9%
2020	14,040		17.5%
2023 (est.)	13,734		−2.2%

=== Racial and ethnic composition ===
Beachwood city, Ohio – Racial and ethnic composition Note: the US Census treats Hispanic/Latino as an ethnic category. This table excludes Latinos from the racial categories and assigns them to a separate category. Hispanics/Latinos may be of any race.
Race / Ethnicity (NH = Non-Hispanic)	Pop 2000	Pop 2010	Pop 2020	% 2000	% 2010	% 2020
White alone (NH)	10,469	9,065	9,515	85.91%	75.84%	67.77%
Black or African American alone (NH)	1,099	1,614	1,954	9.02%	13.50%	13.92%
Native American or Alaska Native alone (NH)	10	5	4	0.08%	0.04%	0.03%
Asian alone (NH)	391	885	1,644	3.21%	7.40%	11.71%
Native Hawaiian or Pacific Islander alone (NH)	2	1	0	0.02%	0.01%	0.00%
Other race alone (NH)	11	23	118	0.09%	0.19%	0.84%
Mixed race or Multiracial (NH)	109	131	451	0.89%	1.10%	3.21%
Hispanic or Latino (any race)	95	229	354	0.78%	1.92%	2.52%
Total	12,186	11,953	14,040	100.00%	100.00%	100.00%

=== 2020 census ===
As of the 2020 census, Beachwood had a population of 14,040. The median age was 45.9 years. 20.6% of residents were under the age of 18 and 29.8% of residents were 65 years of age or older. For every 100 females there were 81.0 males, and for every 100 females age 18 and over there were 76.6 males age 18 and over.

100.0% of residents lived in urban areas, while 0% lived in rural areas.

There were 5,941 households in Beachwood, of which 26.5% had children under the age of 18 living in them. Of all households, 47.5% were married-couple households, 14.6% were households with a male householder and no spouse or partner present, and 33.4% were households with a female householder and no spouse or partner present. About 36.4% of all households were made up of individuals and 20.1% had someone living alone who was 65 years of age or older.

There were 6,425 housing units, of which 7.5% were vacant. Among occupied housing units, 52.8% were owner-occupied and 47.2% were renter-occupied. The homeowner vacancy rate was 0.8% and the rental vacancy rate was 8.0%.

Racial composition as of the 2020 census
Race	Number	Percent
White	9,586	68.3%
Black or African American	1,973	14.1%
American Indian and Alaska Native	10	0.1%
Asian	1,644	11.7%
Native Hawaiian and Other Pacific Islander	0	0%
Some other race	179	1.3%
Two or more races	648	4.6%
Hispanic or Latino (of any race)	354	2.5%

=== 2010 census ===
As of the census of 2010, there were 11,953 people, 5,064 households, and 3,005 families living in the city. The population density was 2,242.6 inhabitants per square mile (865.9/km^{2}). There were 5,483 housing units at an average density of 1,028.7 per square mile (397.2/km^{2}). The racial makeup of the city was 77.3% White, 13.7% African American, 7.4% Asian, 0.4% from other races, and 1.2% from two or more races. Hispanic or Latino of any race were 1.9% of the population.

There were 5,064 households, of which 24.9% had children under the age of 18 living with them, 50.1% were married couples living together, 7.3% had a female householder with no husband present, 2.0% had a male householder with no wife present, and 40.7% were non-families. 37.4% of all households were made up of individuals, and 23.9% had someone living alone who was 65 years of age or older. The average household size was 2.16 and the average family size was 2.88.

The median age in the city was 52.5 years. 19.6% of residents were under the age of 18; 3.9% were between the ages of 18 and 24; 17.2% were from 25 to 44; 27.2% were from 45 to 64; and 32.3% were 65 years of age or older. The gender makeup of the city was 44.3% male and 55.7% female.

=== 2000 census ===
As of the census of 2000, there were 12,186 people, 5,074 households, and 3,181 families living in the city. The population density was 2,307.5 inhabitants per square mile (890.9/km^{2}). There were 5,447 housing units at an average density of 1,031.4 per square mile (398.2/km^{2}). The racial makeup of the city is 86.50% White, 9.08% African American, 0.08% Native American, 3.21% Asian, 0.02% Pacific Islander, 0.15% from other races, and 0.97% from two or more races. Hispanic or Latino of any race were 0.78% of the population.

There were 5,074 households, out of which 24.1% had children under the age of 18 living with them. 56.0% were married couples living together, 5.1% had a female householder with no husband present, and 37.3% were non-families. 35.2% of all households were made up of individuals, and 23.5% had someone living alone who was 65 years of age or older. The average household size was 2.20 and the average family size was 2.86.

In the city the population was spread out, with 19.7% under the age of 18, 3.0% from 18 to 24, 17.2% from 25 to 44, 24.6% from 45 to 64, and 35.4% who were 65 years of age or older. The median age was 52 years. For every 100 females, there were 78.8 males. For every 100 females age 18 and over, there were 71.8 males.

The median income for a household in the city was $65,406, and the median income for a family was $86,632. Males had a median income of $71,829 versus $35,375 for females. The per capita income for the village was $40,509. About 2.5% of families and 4.3% of the population were below the poverty line, including 4.3% of those under the age of 18 and 5.0% of those 65 and older.

Of the city's population over the age of 25, 57.3% held a bachelor's degree or higher. Cleveland Jewish News claimed that 89.5 percent of Beachwood's population is Jewish.

== Economy ==
Beachwood is home to University Hospitals Ahuja Medical Center, and several offices affiliated with the Cleveland Clinic including the Beachwood Family Health and Surgery Center.

Corporate headquarters located in Beachwood include:

- Eaton Corporation
- SITE Centers
- OMNOVA Solutions
- TOA Technologies
- GovSoft.
- Cleveland Jewish News

Retail attractions in Beachwood include Beachwood Place and the adjacent LaPlace Center, an upscale shopping center. The city is also home to Canterbury Golf Club, a USGA member course which has hosted PGA Tour events and has been ranked among top 100 courses in the United States by Golf Digest magazine.

== Arts and culture ==
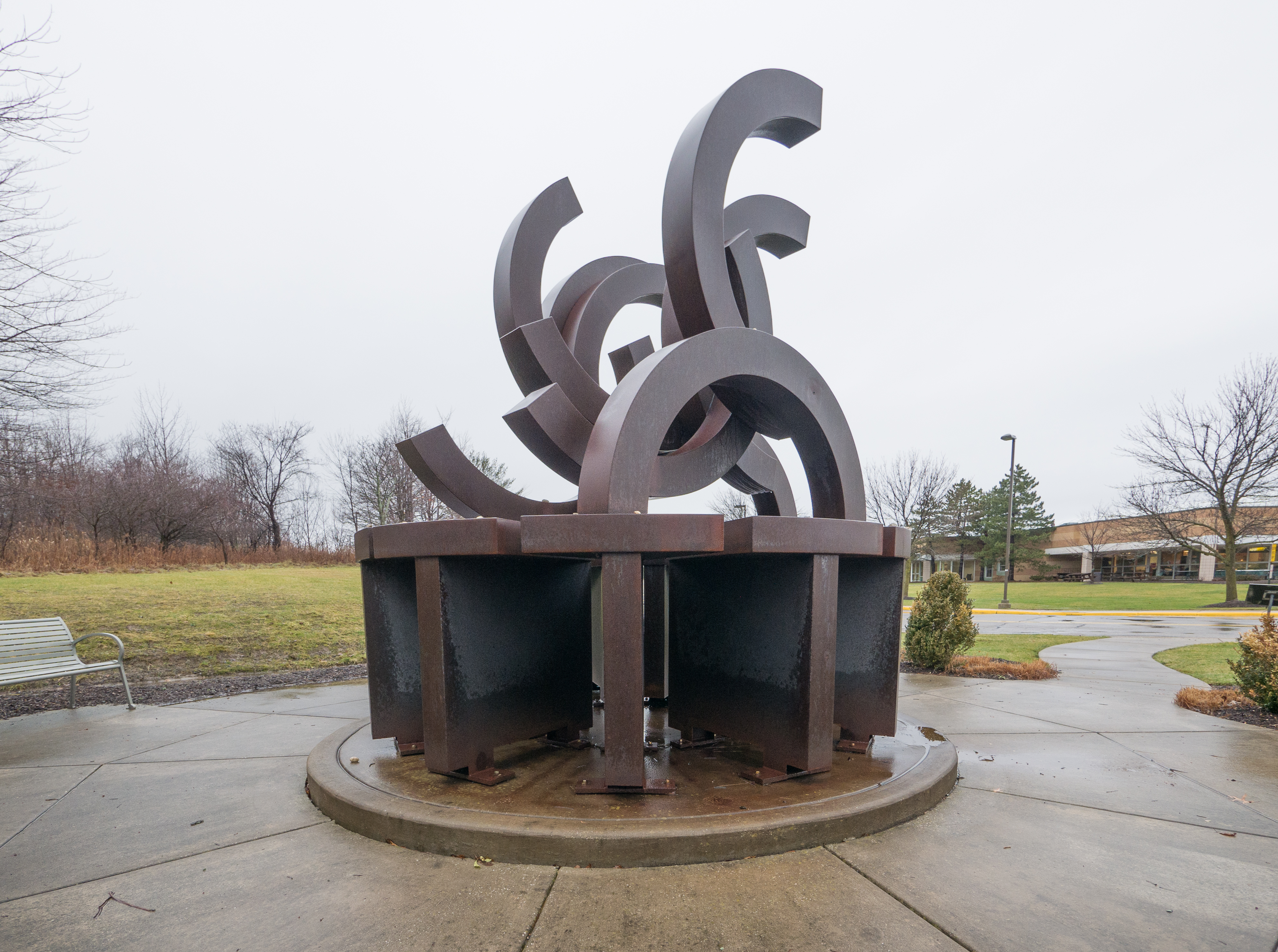
David Berger National Memorial

Beachwood is home to Preston's H.O.P.E. - the largest fully accessible playground in Northeast Ohio.

The Maltz Museum of Jewish Heritage is located in Beachwood and is dedicated to furthering an understanding of Jewish immigrant history and culture in the U.S.

The David Berger National Memorial is the country's smallest National Memorial, honoring the legacy of Jewish-Clevelander Olympian David Mark Berger, who along with 10 other members of the 1972 Israeli Olympic team was murdered by Palestinian terrorist group Black September in the Munich Massacre.

== Education ==
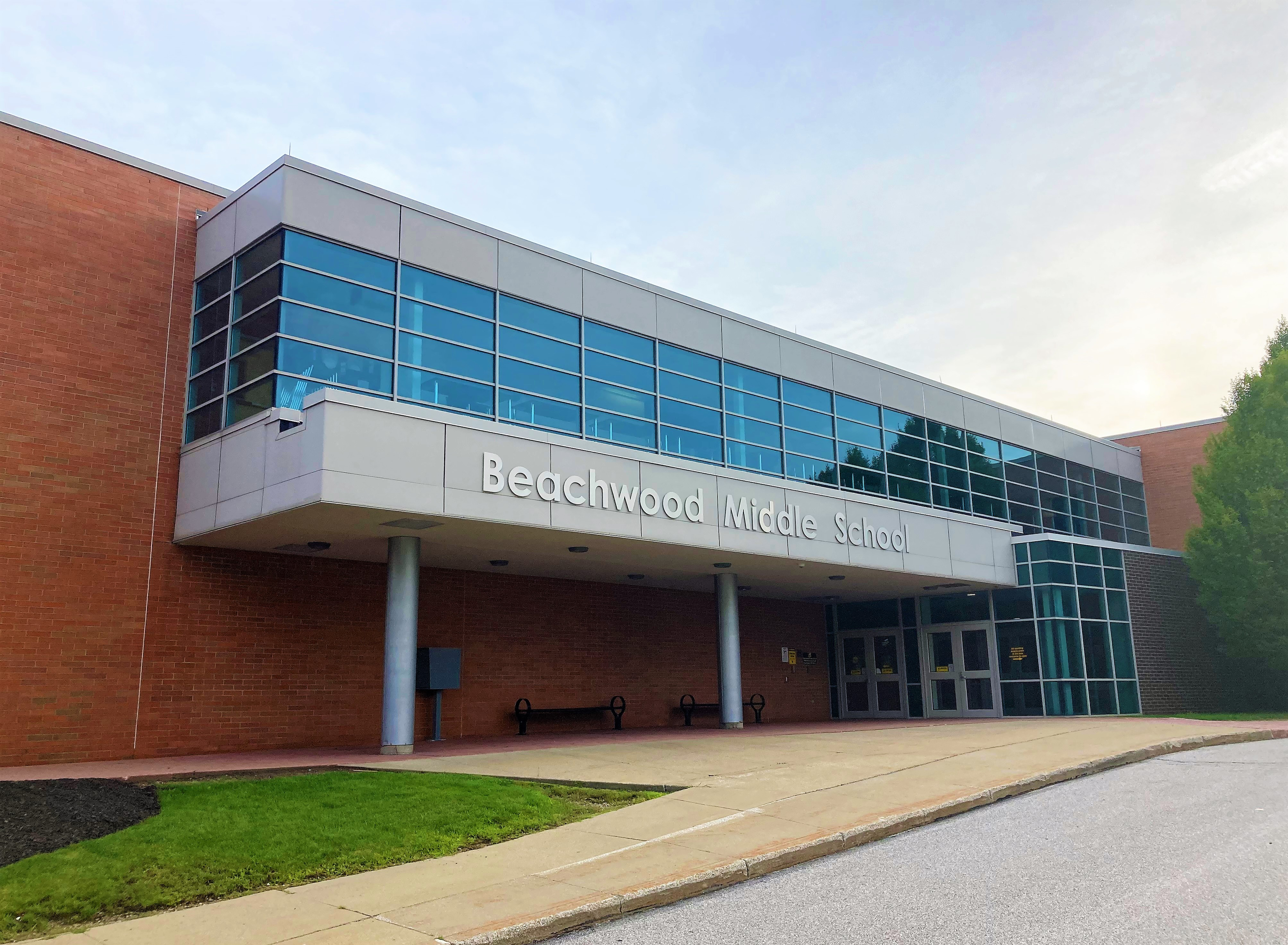
Beachwood Middle School

The Beachwood City Schools consists of:

- Bryden Elementary School: K through 2nd grade
- Hilltop Elementary School: 3rd through 5th grade
- Beachwood Middle School: 6th through 8th grade
- Beachwood High School: 9th through 12th grade

There are three parochial Jewish schools located in Beachwood:

- Fuchs Mizrachi School, an Orthodox Jewish school; Pre-kindergarten through 12th grade
- Beatrice J. Stone Yavne High School: All girls, Orthodox Jewish school; 7th through 12th grade
- Mandel Jewish Day School (Previously known as Agnon Day School): Jewish day school; Pre-kindergarten through 8th grade

== Notable people ==
- Armond Budish – former Speaker of the House of Ohio, former Cuyahoga County Executive
- Mike Chernoff – baseball general manager of the Cleveland Guardians
- Marc Cohn – Grammy Award-winning singer-songwriter known for his 1991 hit 'Walking in Memphis'
- Samuel Glazer – co-founder of Mr. Coffee
- Brad Goldberg – major league baseball pitcher
- Josh Mandel – former Ohio State Treasurer
- Terren Peizer – businessperson, convicted of insider trading and securities fraud
- Arnie Risen – basketball player
- Alex Wyse – Broadway performer
