= Adam Feuerstein =

American columnist

- Education: Emory University
- Occupations: Blogger; columnist

Adam Feuerstein is an American blogger and columnist covering the biotechnology sector.

== Education ==
Adam Feuerstein completed a bachelor's degree in political science at Emory University.

== Career ==
Feuerstein covered business, technology, and commercial real estate for the San Francisco Business Times and the Atlanta Business Chronicle as an assistant managing editor. He later wrote about business software for Upside.com. In March 2001, he joined TheStreet.com. From 2005 to 2006 he worked as a research analyst for a hedge fund before returning to TheStreet. He resigned in May 2017. Feuerstein accepted a position as a national biotechnology columnist at STAT in June 2017.

Feuerstein is known for his style of reporting and his tweets to his large Twitter following. He often shares "unabashed" views on Biotech stock and the Food and Drug Administration.
