= John Kasich presidential campaign =

John Kasich presidential campaign may refer to:

- John Kasich 2000 presidential campaign
- John Kasich 2016 presidential campaign
