= Jai Chabria =

American political strategist

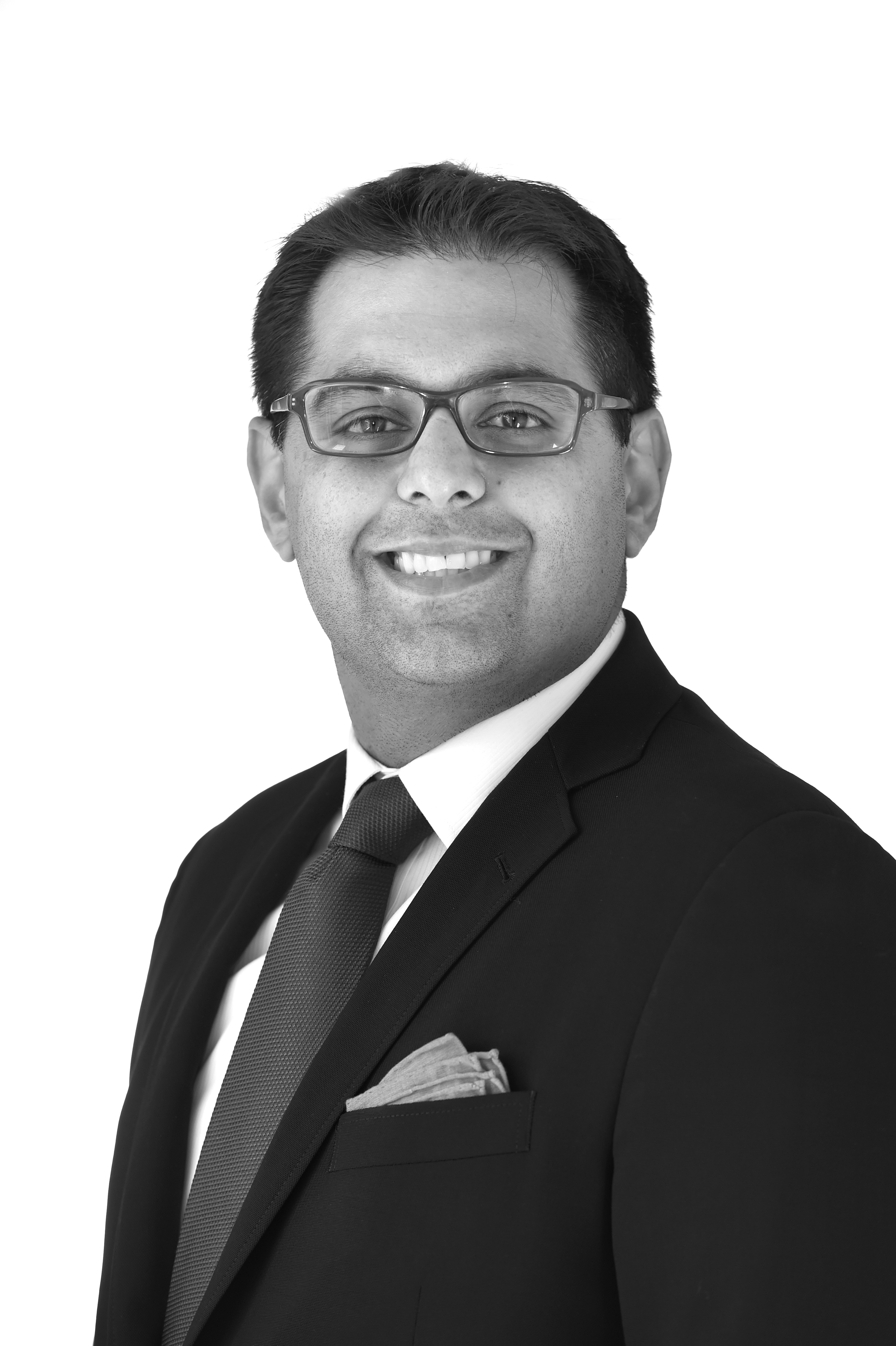
- Education: Ohio Wesleyan University
- Occupation: political strategist
- Years active: 1996 - present
- Known for: Served as a strategist and advisor for former United States senator JD Vance and former Governor of Ohio John Kasich.
- Website: www.madglobalstrategy.com

Jai Chabria is an American political strategist who has served as a strategist and advisor for politicians such as former United States senator JD Vance and former Governor of Ohio John Kasich. He is currently a partner at MAD Global Strategy.

== Early life and education ==
Chabria was born to Sindhi parents from India. Chabria earned a bachelor's degree in Politics and Government from Ohio Wesleyan University.

== Career ==
Chabria began his political career as a political assistant for John Kasich’s congressional reelection campaign in 1996. Chabria was retained as a political assistant for Kasich's 2000 presidential campaign. He also worked on special projects for Kasich's New Century Project political action committee. He later worked with Kasich when he left Congress, and they both worked for the financial firm Lehman Brothers.

Chabria was eventually appointed as the Senior Advisor to the Governor after Kasich was elected Governor of Ohio in 2010. In mid 2010's, Chabria was also a member of the Kasich administration's Ohio Human Trafficking Task Force. In 2011, he oversaw the transition of Ohio's Department of Development as it became the private economic development corporation JobsOhio.

In 2011, Chabria signed an MOU on behalf of the State of Ohio, with Dan Gilbert, the CEO of Rock Ohio Caesars. The agreement allowed for an extra $900 million to flow to the state, establish the tax methodology for Ohio Casinos, and allowed for video lottery terminals to be installed racetracks around the state.

Chabria eventually left his role as Kasich's Senior Advisor to oversee planning for the 2016 Republican National Convention in Cleveland. In 2022, Chabria served as a chief strategist for JD Vance’s senatorial campaign. Chabria is credited with making one of two calls to John Kasich to help convince him to drop out of the 2016 presidential race.

In addition to his work in politics, Chabria also worked jobs in investment banking for companies such as Lehman Brothers and Barclays Capital. Prior to his current job as a managing partner of the public affairs firm MAD Global Strategy, he also served as managing director of Mercury, another public strategy firm.

He also co-founded the nonprofit organization Our Ohio Renewal with J.D. Vance. During Vance's 2022 campaign for U.S. Senate, Tim Ryan, the Democratic nominee, said the charity was a front for Vance's political ambitions. Ryan pointed to reports that the organization paid a Vance political adviser and conducted public opinion polling, while its efforts to address addiction failed. Vance denied the characterization. A 2021 report by Business Insider revealed that Our Ohio Renewal's tax filings showed that in its first year, it spent more on "management services" provided by Jai Chabria, as executive director, than it did on programs to fight opioid abuse.

In 2023, Chabria was Senior Strategist to WV Governor Patrick Morrisey’s campaign for Governor.

In 2024, he directed the debate preparations for JD Vance for the Vice Presidential debate.

In 2025, he also became the senior strategist and general consultant for Vivek Ramaswamy’s gubernatorial campaign.

In January 2025, he became a partner at MAD Global.

Chabria has served as an analyst for television news outlets such as Fox News, Fox Business, and the Canadian Broadcasting Corporation.

He has also been interviewed by news outlets such as NBC News and The Columbus Dispatch.

== Personal life ==
He lives in Powell, Ohio and is married to Tammy Chabria. They have a daughter and a son together.
