= The Two Paths =

The Two Paths can refer to:

- The Two Paths (1911 film), an American film
- Two Paths (1954 film), a Spanish film
- Two Paths (album), a 2017 Ensiferum album
- Two Paths: America Divided or United, a 2017 book by John Kasich
