= Two Paths: America Divided or United =

2017 book by John Kasich

- Author: John Kasich
- Language: English
- Subject: Politics
- Genre: Non-fiction
- Published: April 25, 2017
- Publisher: Thomas Dunne Books
- Publication place: United States
- Pages: 321
- ISBN: 978-1-250-13846-0 (Hardcover)

Two Paths: America Divided or United is a 2017 political non-fiction book by the former Ohio governor John Kasich. The book reflects and ruminates on the former governor's political career and 2016 presidential run, and expounds his vision for America's future.
