= Every Other Monday =

- Authors: John Kasich, Daniel Paisner
- Language: English
- Genre: non-fiction
- Publisher: Atria Books
- Publication date: 2010
- Publication place: United States of America
- Pages: 224
- ISBN: 9781439148273
- OCLC: 464593362

Every Other Monday; Twenty Years of Life, Lunch, Faith, and Friendship is a 2010 book by then-Ohio governor John Kasich about a Bible study he attends every other Monday with a group of friends over lunch at an Italian restaurant in Columbus, Ohio.

== Contents ==
Kasich's parents, John and Ann Kasich, were killed by a drunk driver while driving in their car in Kasich's hometown of McKees Rocks, Pennsylvania. Kasich, then a United States Congressman, was so deeply shaken by their deaths that he turned to God after many years of little connection with the faith of his childhood.

Kasich relates that after the accident, he gathered "seven or eight of my buddies and said, 'Look, you go on a parallel path and I'll join you'", explaining how the Bible group, and the book, came to be.

There are about 12 men in the group, and over the more than 20 years they have been meeting, Kasich writes that they have "become one another's closest friends and surest sounding boards."

Kasich attended Mother of Sorrows Catholic Church in McKees Rocks with his family as a boy, and served there as an altar boy. Like his parents, he later moved from the Roman Catholic to the Episcopalian Church, and now attends St. Augustine in Westerville, Ohio; his daughters, Emma and Reese attend a Christian school.

Kasich has based policies upon his religious views and done so publicly. He has repeatedly stated that his social service policy is faith-driven.

The book was listed as a top-ten bestseller by The New York Times.
