= Heartland with John Kasich =

American news/talk television program hosted by John Kasich

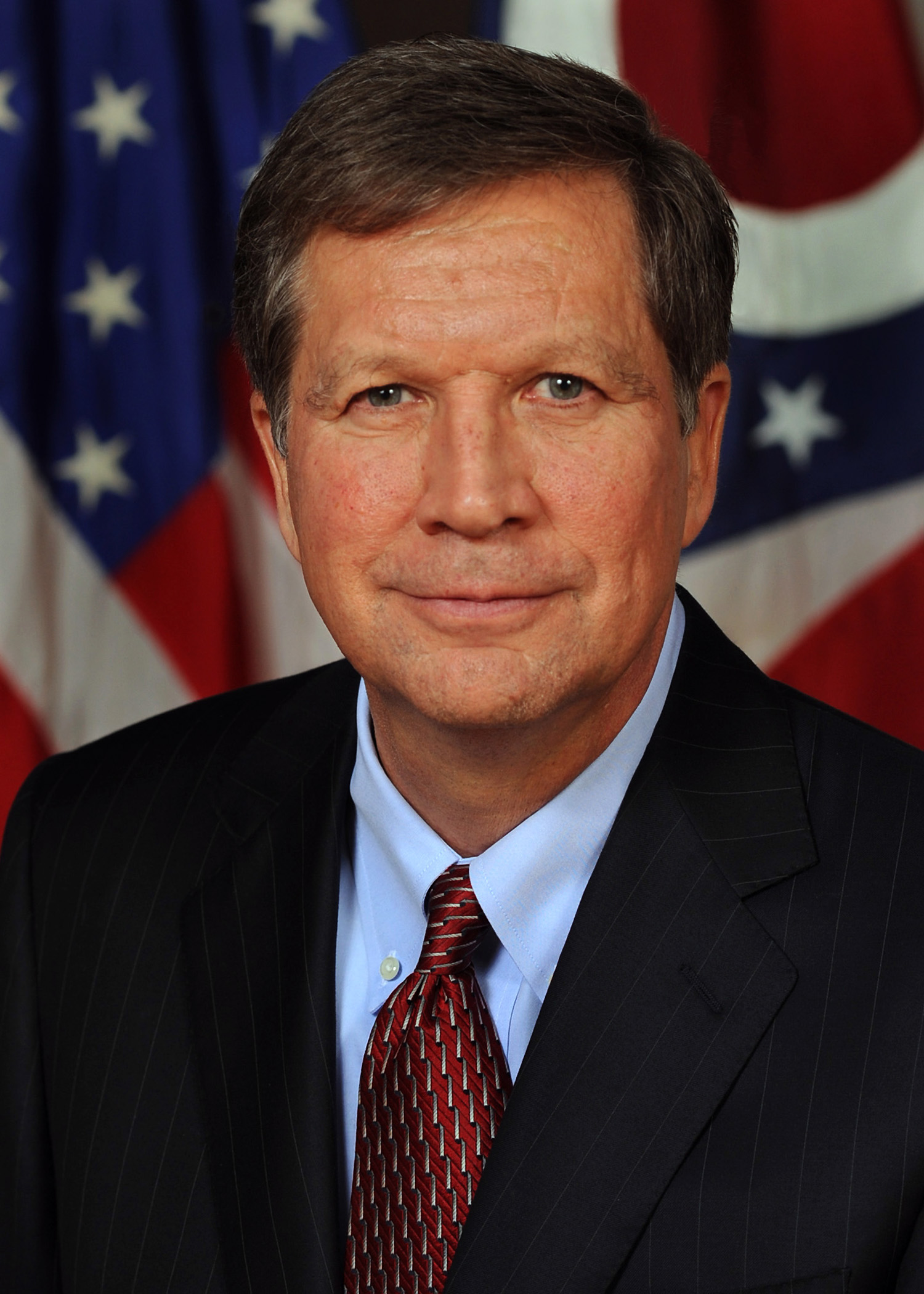
Heartland host John Kasich

Heartland with John Kasich (originally titled From the Heartland with John Kasich) is an American news/talk television program hosted by John Kasich that appeared on Fox News Channel from 2001 to 2007. Kasich was a former U.S. Congressman from Ohio and sought the Republican nomination for president in 2000.

== Show ==
The show debuted in 2001, after Kasich, who had chosen to not seek reelection to the House of Representatives, lost the 2000 Republican presidential nomination. It was broadcast live every Saturday at 8:00 p.m. ET. Unlike most programming on Fox News Channel that was filmed in New York City or Washington, D.C., the show was based in Kasich's hometown of Columbus, Ohio.

Heartland was similar in format to Bill O'Reilly's news program The O'Reilly Factor. Some of the stories were similar to a wrap up of the events that happened during the week on The O'Reilly Factor. Kasich was also frequently a substitute host of The O'Reilly Factor.

The final edition of Heartland with John Kasich aired on April 21, 2007. Three years later, Kasich was elected as governor of Ohio, and was elected for a second term in 2014. He later sought the Republican nomination for President in the 2016 election.
