= Courage Is Contagious =

1998 book by John Kasich

- Author: John Kasich
- Publisher: Doubleday
- Publication date: 1998

Courage Is Contagious is a 1998 book by Ohio governor (then-representative) John Kasich.

Courage Is Contagious is often compared to the 1957 book Profiles in Courage by John F. Kennedy, then a United States Senator planning to run for president, profiled acts of political heroism by eight United States Senators. Kasich wrote Courage Is Contagious as a United States representative contemplating running for the Presidency, which he did in the early Republican Party presidential primaries, 2000. In contrast with Kennedy's book, Kasich's book describes the lives of ordinary Americans who perform extraordinary feats of public service.

Kasich says that he wrote the book after being asked by a conservative think tank to write a book about government budgets but decided to write a more inspirational book instead. The book highlights the surging popularity of volunteering in charitable and civic improvement activities of all kinds.

Royalties from the book were donated to fund the work of the men and women who Kasich had profiled.

Courage Is Contagious was a New York Times bestseller in November and December 1998.
