= John Kasich 2016 presidential campaign =

American political campaign

Kasich for America
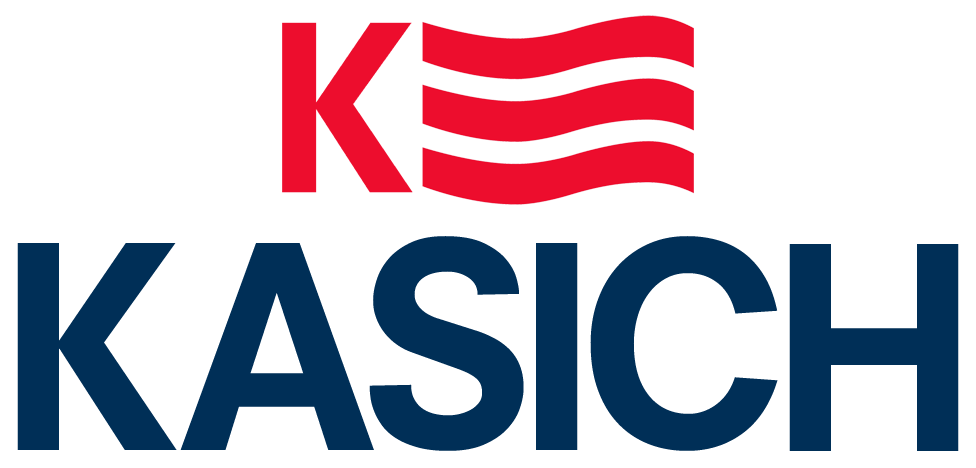
- Campaign: 2016 Republican Party presidential primaries
- Candidate: John Kasich; Governor of Ohio (2011–2019)
- Affiliation: Republican Party
- Announced: July 21, 2015
- Suspended: May 4, 2016
- Headquarters: Cleveland, Ohio, U.S.
- Key people: Beth Hansen, campaign manager John Weaver, senior strategist Charlie Black, delegate strategist Matt Carle, Executive director at New Day for America PAC
- Receipts: US$7,582,364 (2015-12-31)
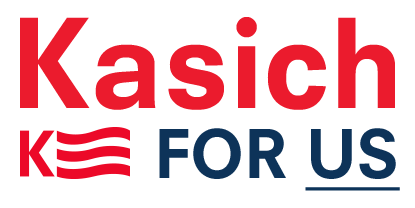
- Slogan

Website
- www.johnkasich.com

The 2016 presidential campaign of John Kasich, the 69th governor of Ohio, was announced on July 21, 2015. He was a candidate for the 2016 Republican Party presidential nomination. He earned 154 delegates and won only one contest, his home state, Ohio. Kasich suspended his campaign on May 4, 2016, one day after becoming the last major challenger to Donald Trump for the nomination. Kasich vied to become the first Pennsylvania native to hold the office since James Buchanan in 1856, as well as the first from the city of Pittsburgh to do so.

== Background ==
In 1982, Kasich was elected to the U.S. House of Representatives from the Ohio's 12th congressional district, defeating incumbent Democrat Bob Shamansky, and succeeded him in office on January 3, 1983. After twelve years in Congress, when Republicans took control of Congress in 1994, Kasich was appointed the Chairman of the United States House Committee on the Budget, beginning work at the start of the 104th Congress. As Chairman of the budget committee, Kasich took part in the crafting and passage of the Balanced Budget Act of 1997, which led to the first fiscal year without a deficit since 1969.

In 1999, Kasich sought a bid for the Presidency in the Republican primaries of 2000, but withdrew prior to the primary season and retired from Congress in 2001. Following his exit from Congress in 2001, Kasich hosted Heartland with John Kasich, a television talk show on the Fox News Channel, until his exit in April 2007. In 2001, Kasich joined Lehman Brothers' investment banking division as a managing director. He remained at Lehman Brothers until the firm declared bankruptcy in 2008. Lehman Brothers paid Kasich a $182,692 salary and $432,200 bonus in 2008. Kasich stated that the bonus was for work performed in 2007.

In May 2009, Kasich announced his candidacy for Governor of Ohio, winning the Republican nomination, and defeating incumbent Governor Ted Strickland in the 2010 general election. In the 2014 general election, Kasich won his reelection for Governor in a landslide, winning 86 of the 88 Ohio counties against Democratic candidate Ed FitzGerald.

In April 2015, Kasich announced the formation of his "New Day For America" group. Formerly a 527 group, it filed as a super PAC in July 2015. Between April 20 and June 30, 2015, the super PAC raised over $11.1 million from 165 "reportable contributions," including 34 contributions of $100,000 or more. Major contributors to the PAC include Floyd Kvamme, who donated $100,000, and Jim Dicke, chairman emeritus of Crown Equipment Corporation, who donated $250,000. According to FEC filings, Kasich's campaign had $2.5 million on hand at the beginning of 2016. In May 2015, sources close to him had said he was "virtually certain" to run for the Republican nomination for president.

== Campaign ==
On July 21, 2015, Kasich announced his candidacy for the presidency in 2016 at the Ohio State University in Columbus, Ohio.

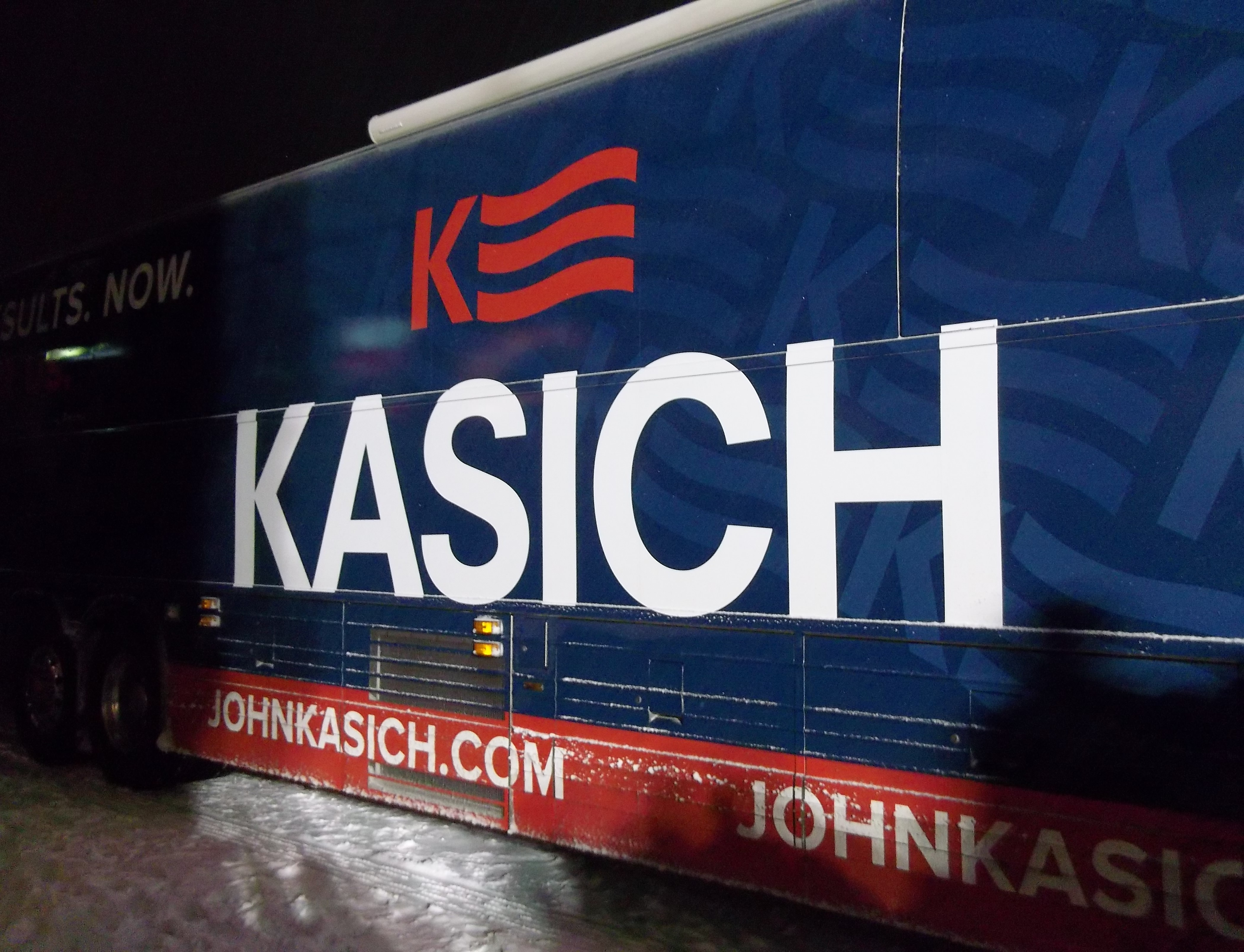
John Kasich campaign bus

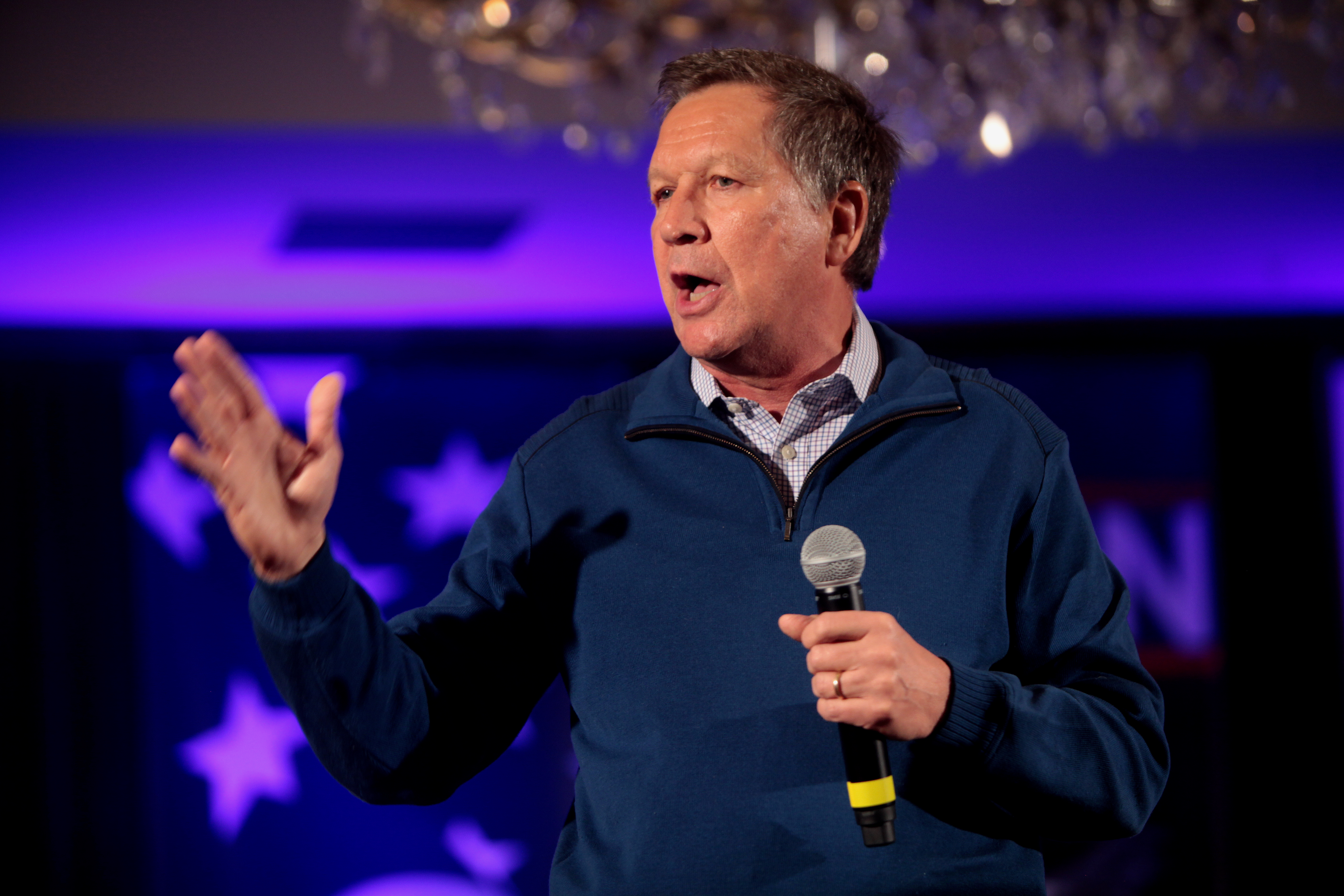
Kasich speaking at a town hall in New Hampshire

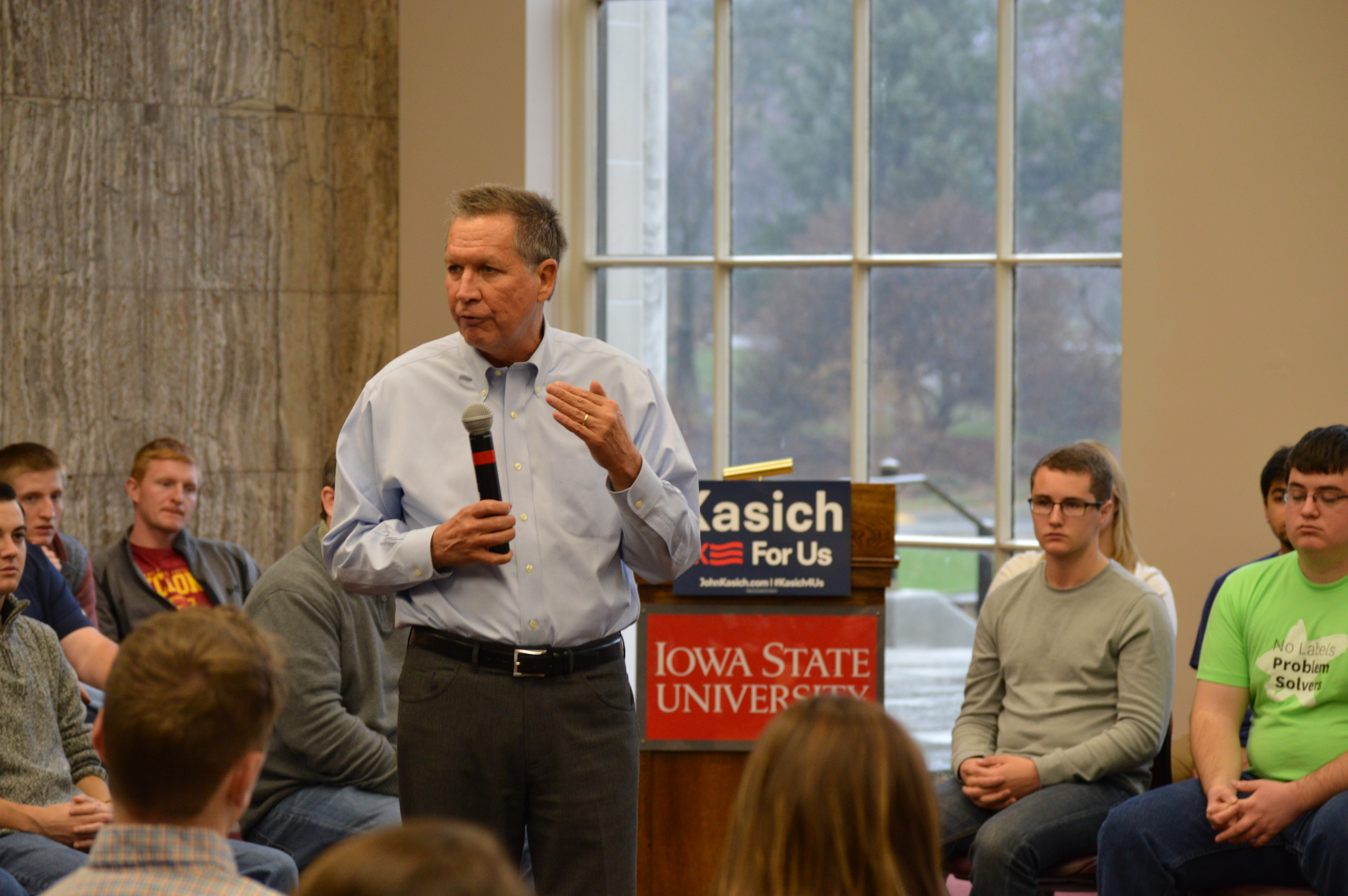
Kasich speaking at Iowa State University in November 2015

Kasich had declared that his campaign would not be "getting people riled up about how bad everything is", but rather, he considered his campaign to be about "light and hope". According to Kasich, his campaign had deferred from attacks on other candidates.

In the Republican debates, Kasich had some fiery exchanges with the front runner Donald Trump, especially concerning immigration reform and Trump's plan to deport all 11 million illegal immigrants currently residing in the United States. During the CNBC Republican debate, Trump accused Kasich of having struck luck with fracking and sitting on the board of Lehman Brothers' at the time of its bankruptcy. Trump furthered, "He was such a nice guy. And he said, Oh, I'm never going to attack. But then his poll numbers tanked. He's got – that's why he's on the end – and he got nasty. And he got nasty. So you know what? You can have him." In the fourth GOP debate which was moderated by the Fox Business Network and The Wall Street Journal, Kasich, along with Jeb Bush, slammed Trump's plan. Kasich responded at one point, "It's a silly argument. It's not an adult argument. We all know you can't pick them up and ship them back across the border."

By the first week of January, Kasich had held his fiftieth town hall meeting in New Hampshire, more than any other presidential candidate in the state. A Monmouth University poll released on January 11 showed Kasich in second place in New Hampshire, tied with Ted Cruz, both with 14%. Explaining his rise to being tied for second place in New Hampshire, Kasich reasoned on January 12 that his increased numbers were due to him having substance and that he believed a victory in the state would give the Kasich campaign "momentum that could take us all the way to the nomination."

During the sixth debate, Kasich responded to a question pertaining to Democratic presidential candidate Bernie Sanders, stating that the Republican nominee would "win every state" if he was the Democratic Party nominee and that based on him knowing Sanders, he could promise he "won't be president of the United States."

In mid-January, Kasich began to surge in some polls, leading journalist E. J. Dionne to speculate that Kasich might be filling a desire on the part of Republican "working-class voters who are economically pressed and looking for a champion," but who seemed to prefer Kasich's "sunnier approach" to the "darker message[s]" coming from other Republican contenders. On January 25, he was endorsed for the Republican nomination by The Boston Globe and The New York Times.

Kasich had a strong showing in New Hampshire, coming in second place, surprising many in the media and in politics. Chris Christie suspended his campaign the day after the race, with many of his supporters, including his top donor, going to Kasich.

Kasich ended up in fifth place with 7.6% of the vote in South Carolina after Trump, Rubio, Cruz, and Bush. Bush suspended his campaign the day after the primaries, leaving Rubio and Kasich as the only "establishment" candidates left. Kasich came in fifth at the Nevada caucuses, with only 3.6% of the vote.

On Super Tuesday, Kasich picked up a total of 21 delegates throughout eleven states. He finished second in both the states of Massachusetts and Vermont behind Trump with 18% and 30% of the vote respectively, but otherwise placed in single digits in the rest of the contests. In the period of time between Super Tuesday and the winner-take-all contest period, the governor was awarded 27 delegates from the states of Kansas (1) and Kentucky (5), and also narrowly finished third place in Michigan behind Ted Cruz, taking 17 delegates. On March 12, Kasich again narrowly placed second, this time behind Senator Marco Rubio in Washington, D.C. by 50 votes and collected 9 delegates.

On March 15, Kasich won in his home state of Ohio, while Marco Rubio lost in his home state of Florida (to Trump) and withdrew from the race. Thus, Kasich was left with only two Republican primary opponents: Trump and Cruz. This caused Vox to declare that Kasich was the Republican "establishment's last best hope against Trump", while noting that "Kasich has positioned himself as the anti-Trump". However, on March 16, Kasich was mathematically eliminated from becoming the Republican Party's nominee, given that he had not won enough delegates in North Carolina, Illinois, or Missouri, all of which held their primaries the previous night. The following week on March 22, Kasich came in fourth place to Rubio's ghost in the Arizona primary, with Rubio edging out Kasich by nearly 18,000 votes.

In April, Kasich campaigned in New York ahead of the state primary, where Trump led in polls by a significant margin. Kasich received an endorsement from the New York Daily News on April 13. On April 14, Kasich received the endorsement of George Pataki, who called him the GOP's best chance to win the general election. It was the first endorsement Kasich had received from a former fellow candidate in the field. Later that day, Kasich attended a gala along with Trump and Cruz where he said, "I'm going to leave Cleveland as the nominee. Whether you believe it or not, it's going to happen."

In April 2016, the campaigns of Kasich and Ted Cruz agreed to "split up" some of the remaining primaries in an effort to block Donald Trump from gaining the 1,237 delegates necessary to clinch the GOP nomination. However, the pact proved challenging; for example, though Cruz was intended to focus on the Indiana primary, Kasich said that his supporters should still vote for him there. And days later, Cruz clarified that there is "no alliance" but, rather, he and Kasich "made a determination where to focus [the campaigns'] energies."

By May 2016, Trump had amassed a sizable lead of 996 delegates as compared with Cruz's 565 delegates and Kasich's 153 delegates. On May 3, after losing the Indiana primary, Cruz suspended his campaign and Republican National Committee (RNC) chair Reince Priebus stated that Trump will be the presumptive nominee. The next day, Kasich announced that he would also drop out, leaving Trump as the remaining candidate and presumptive nominee. Don Thibaut and Jai Chabria were credited with making calls to John Kasich to help convince him to drop out of the race.

In December, two faithless electors voted for Governor Kasich in the general election, however one was disallowed.

A 2018 study on media coverage of the 2016 election noted "the paradox of the Kasich campaign’s longevity while it lacked public interest provides some evidence for the idea that Kasich’s biggest supporters were the media".

== Political positions ==
Kasich has taken positions on a number of public policy issues during his tenure in Congress and as Governor of Ohio.

=== Kasich proposals ===
Percentage of vote received by Kasich by state or territory. 0.0–9.9% 10.0–19.9% 20.0–29.9% 30.0–39.9% 40.0–49.9% 50.0%+

Kasich has put together a series of proposals aimed at changing the way the government finances itself and growing the economy. On the budget, he stated that he would work with Congress to put together a plan to balance the budget in eight years, supporting a balanced budget amendment. Kasich would increase the defense budget but freeze other non-discretionary spending. He would reform entitlements including raising the retirement age for eligibility for certain programs. He has laid out a specific outline predicting the revenue and spending for his tenure if he is president.

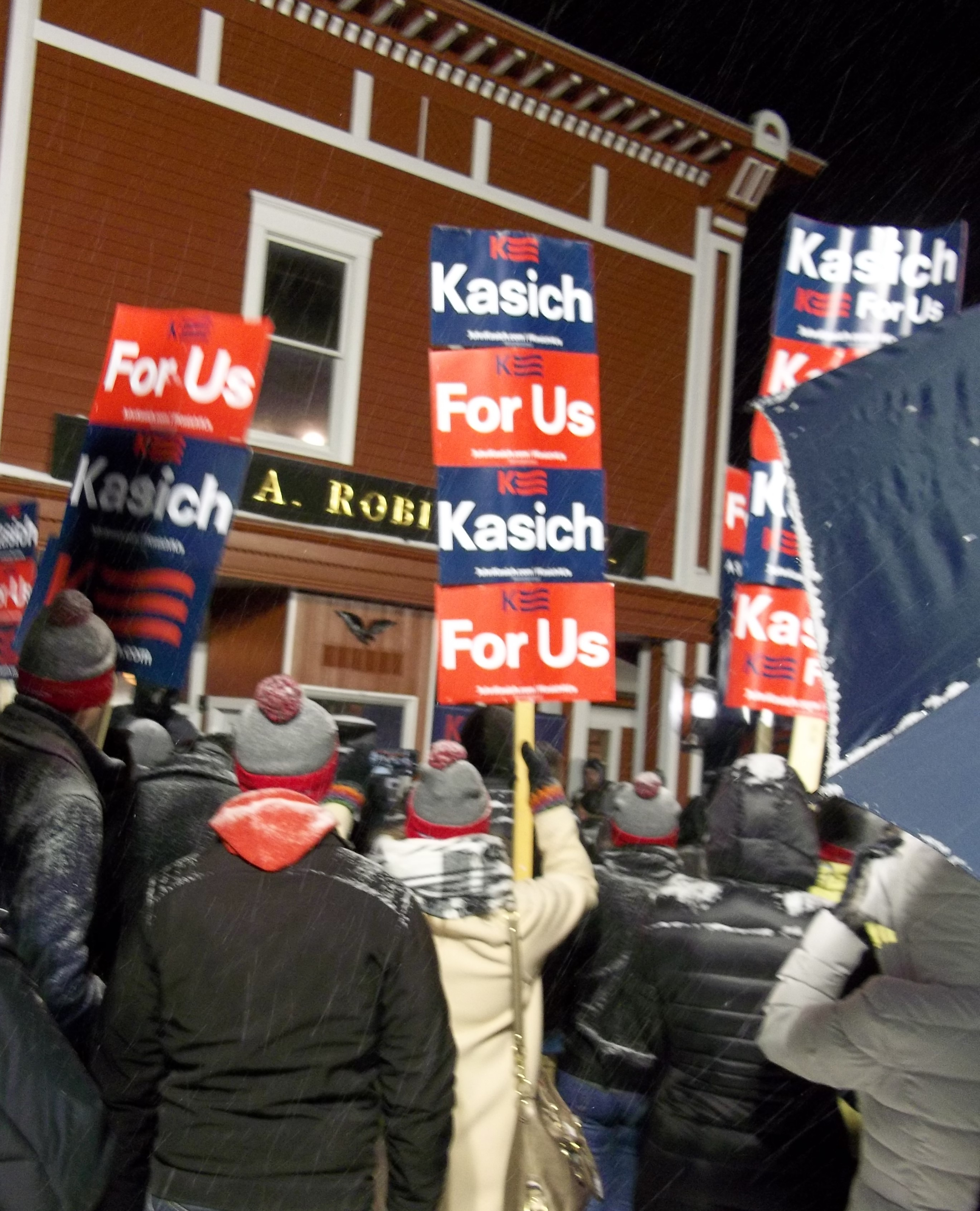
Primary eve rally at Robie's Country Store in Hooksett, New Hampshire, on February 8, 2016

Kasich supported lowering tax rates for individuals and businesses along with simplifying the number of income tax brackets from seven to three and would implement a top tax rate of 28%. He supports reducing the top corporate tax rate from 35% to 25%. He supports doubling the tax credit for small businesses. He also supports reforming the Internal Revenue Service and reform regulations as president. He would implement a one-year moratorium for new regulations on businesses. He supports requiring Congress to implement cost-benefit analyses. He supports many reforms that would make it harder to implement "costly" regulations on businesses. He stated that he wants to "dismantle Washington" by turning over transportation, medicaid, education, and low income public assistance to the states. On energy, his goal is to become energy independent and has said he is open to all sources of energy. He says he will use "common sense" in energy regulations and supports new research in technologies. In 2014, Kasich had signed into a law SB 310, a bill that froze Ohio's renewable energy mandate for two years, making Ohio the first state to halt progress on its green energy goals. SB 310 removed the requirement, first set in 2008, for utilities to add renewables to their energy mix.

=== Abortion ===
Kasich opposed federal funding for Planned Parenthood. As governor he prevented new dollars from going towards Planned Parenthood in Ohio. He supported streamlining the adoption process, but supported providing a funding stream for rape crisis centers so they could receive needed support and providers could receive training and technical assistance. He believes in exceptions for abortion in the cases of rape, incest, and/or the life of the mother. Kasich has been attacked by Planned Parenthood and NARAL Pro-Choice America.

=== Education ===
Kasich believed that education power should be controlled at the state and local level instead of the federal level. Kasich says he opposes federal learning standards but believes states should create their own standards. He supported school choice, with Ohio having quadrupling the number of available vouchers and increased the number of schools whose students are eligible for vouchers.

=== Guns ===
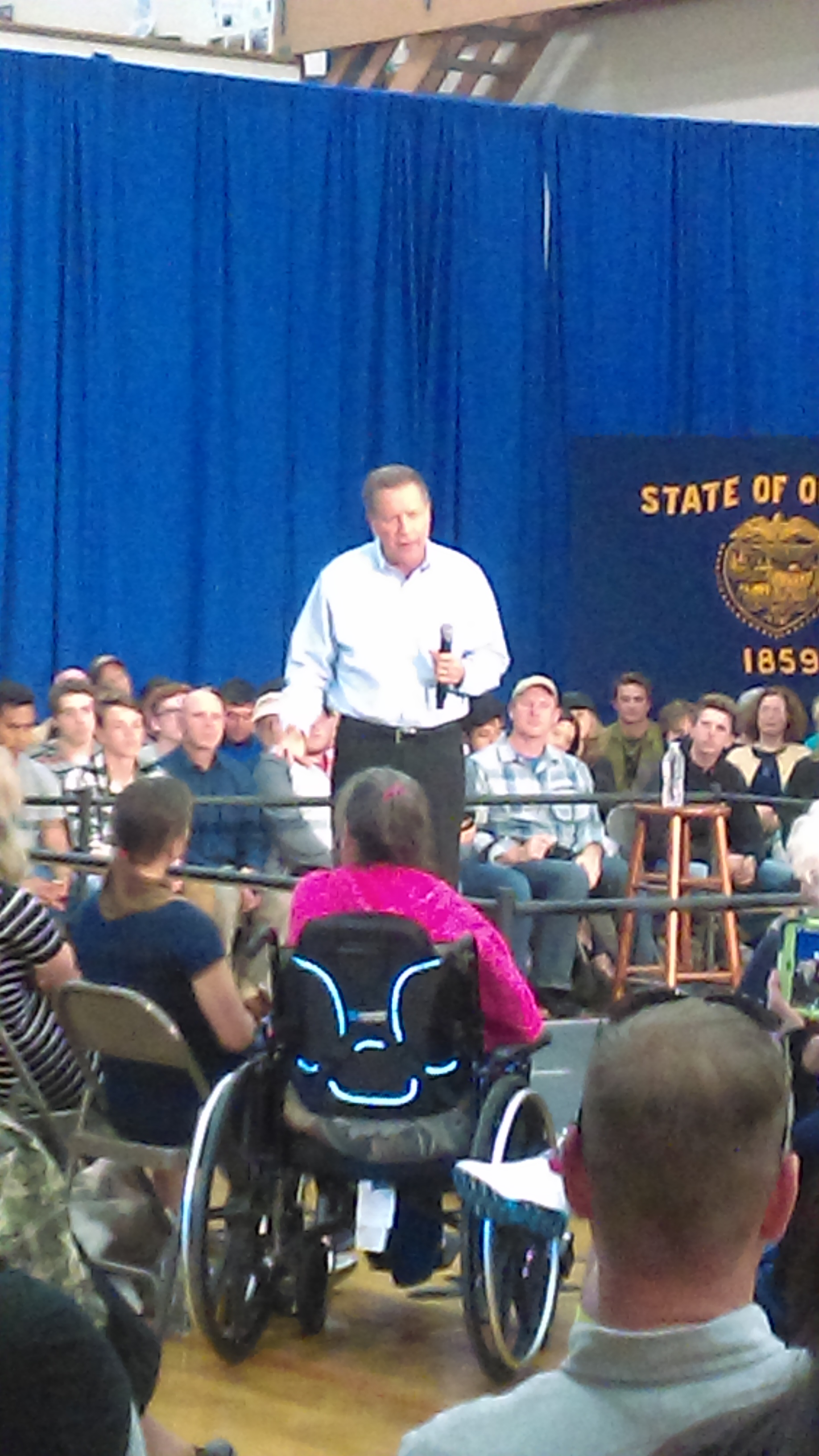
Kasich speaking at Central Medford High School in Medford, Oregon, in 2016.

Kasich is a supporter of the right to bear arms and, as governor, enacted legislation to defend gun rights. He has said he is gun-owner, and in the 2014 gubernatorial election he was endorsed by the NRA Political Victory Fund. Kasich said that he opposes Barack Obama's executive order on gun control. As governor, he enacted legislation which removed restrictions on licensing requirements for hunters.

=== Healthcare ===
Kasich opposed the Patient Protection and Affordable Care Act though he did expand Medicaid in his state under Obamacare. He says the United States should implement a system that has "patient-centered care, choices, market competition, decentralized decision-making, higher quality, respect for individuals and an end to Obamacare's big government interference".

=== Social safety net ===
He stated that due to him working in Congress and being Governor of Ohio, one has to make sure that when a President is set out to lift people up, to make sure that they get the help that they need and taxpayers get the value they deserve. He supported welfare reform and was a part of the team that introduced the Personal Responsibility and Work Opportunity Act. He supported cutting taxes for low income families which he says he has done in Ohio in addition to increasing the earned income tax credit. He stated that part of criminal justice reform should be helping those addicted to drugs and the mentally ill.

== Endorsements ==
Kasich had obtained endorsements from, among others: Actor Tim Allen, former Attorney General Alberto Gonzales; Senator Rob Portman; former Speaker of the House John Boehner; former California Governor Arnold Schwarzenegger; Governor Butch Otter of Idaho; and numerous newspaper editorial boards, including that of The New York Times.
