= John Kasich 2000 presidential campaign =

American political campaign

- Campaign: U.S. presidential election, 2000
- Candidate: John Kasich; U.S. Representative from Ohio (1983–2001)
- Affiliation: Republican Party
- Headquarters: 2021 East Dublin-Granville Road; Suite 2000; Columbus, Ohio 43229
- Receipts: 2,710

The 2000 presidential campaign of John Kasich, a member of the United States House of Representatives from Ohio's 12th District who eventually became the Governor of Ohio 10 years later, was officially launched on February 15, 1999, when he announced the formation of an exploratory committee. Had he won, Kasich would have been the first president since James A. Garfield to be elected from the House of Representatives, as well as the first Pennsylvania native since James Buchanan to hold the office.

Kasich suspended his campaign on July 14, 1999.

== Background ==
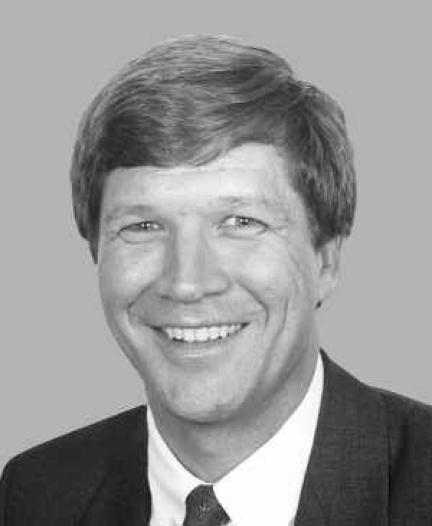
John Kasich in 1997

In 1996, while he was House Budget Committee chairman, John Kasich created the Pioneer Political Action Committee. Pioneer PAC was to help fund Kasich's travel costs so he could campaign for fellow Republicans across the country. In April 1997, Kasich began traveling to Iowa and New Hampshire, the first two contests in the primaries.

== Campaign ==
On February 15, 1999, Kasich kicked off his campaign by announcing the formation of an exploratory committee. That same day, Kasich began a campaign swing through the early primary states of Iowa and New Hampshire.

At 46 years of age, John Kasich was one of the youngest candidates in the 2000 Republican primaries. Kasich played up this fact, portraying himself as a fresh face and comparing himself to "Jolt Cola in a market dominated by Pepsi and Coca-Cola", in reference to the early favorites in the race, George W. Bush and Elizabeth Dole.

Kasich also chose to portray himself as a candidate who is not afraid to work with Democrats. He frequently brought up his prominent role in helping to pass four balanced budgets with President Bill Clinton.

In March, Kasich was involved in an incident with a reporter. When a reporter from WNDS-TV asked when he would decide to run for president and drop the exploratory committee, Kasich responded in an angry tone, "I have no idea. That's a mechanical, political question and I don't do politics. You'll have to ask my press secretary." The clip of the exchange was aired on television. Kasich's campaign responded, saying that he was unaware that he was being filmed.

Kasich missed dozens of votes in order to spend time on the campaign trail, leading to upset voters in his home district. Kasich was also struggling to raise money, and by June, he had yet to break $2 million.

On July 14, Kasich announced that he was dropping out of the race.

== Aftermath ==
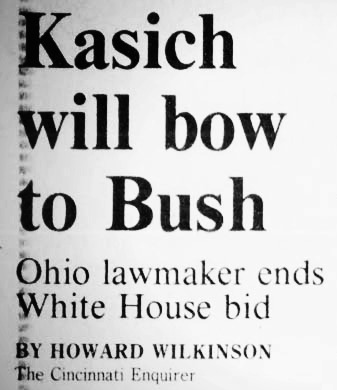
Kasich dropped out of the race and endorsed Bush

Kasich went on to become the Governor of Ohio in 2011.

In 2016, Kasich again ran for president, earning 154 delegates in the Republican primaries and winning his home state of Ohio, but suspended his campaign May 4, 2016.
