= John Kasich =

American politician and author (born 1952)

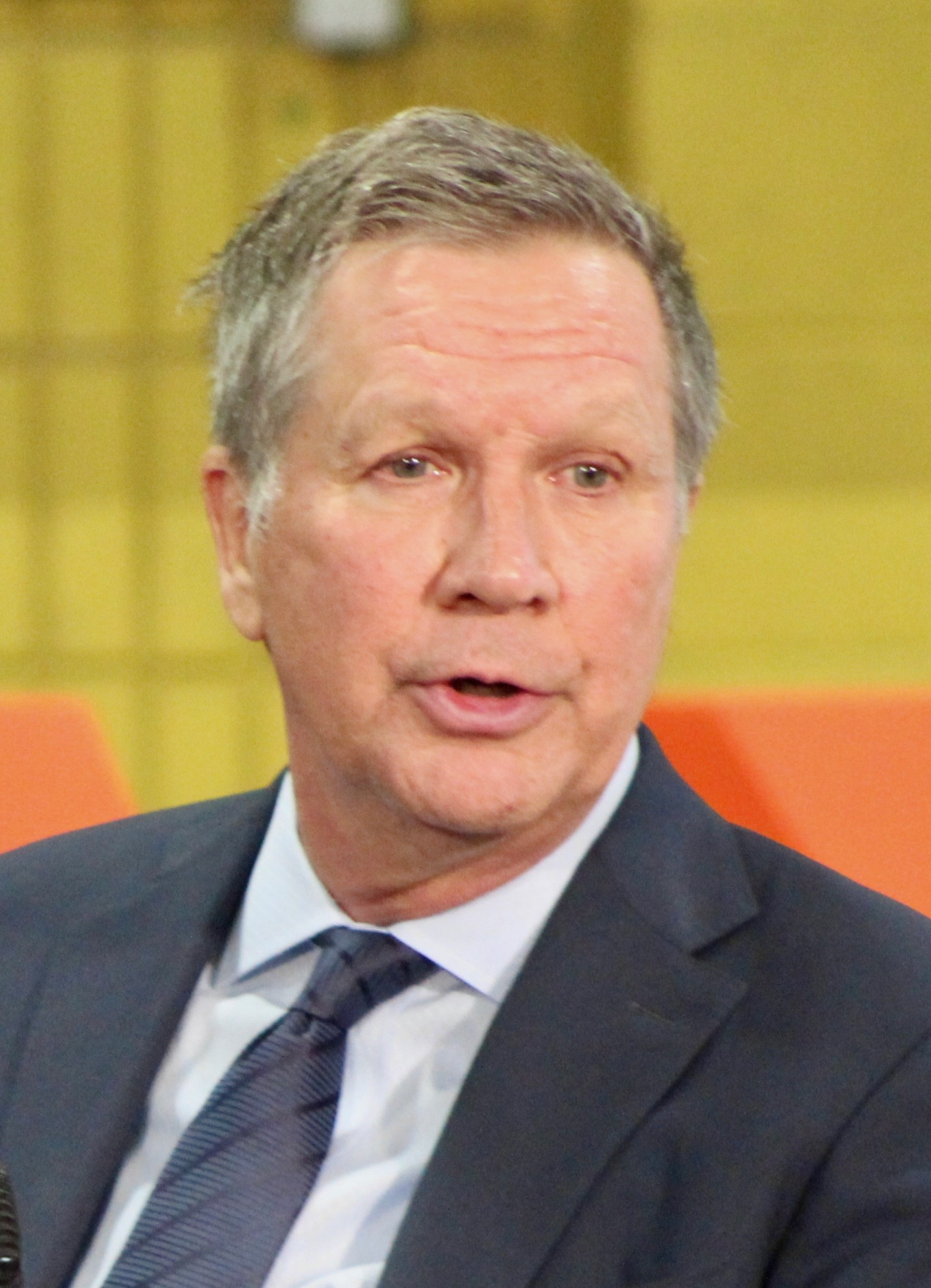
- Kasich in 2018

69th Governor of Ohio
- In office January 10, 2011 – January 14, 2019
- Lieutenant: Mary Taylor
- Preceded by: Ted Strickland
- Succeeded by: Mike DeWine

Member of the U.S. House of Representatives from Ohio's 12th district
- In office January 3, 1983 – January 3, 2001
- Preceded by: Bob Shamansky
- Succeeded by: Pat Tiberi
House positions
Chair of the House Budget Committee
In office January 3, 1995 – January 3, 2001
Preceded by	Martin Sabo
Succeeded by	Jim Nussle
Ranking Member of the House Budget Committee
In office January 3, 1993 – January 3, 1995
Preceded by	Bill Gradison
Succeeded by	Martin Sabo

Member of the Ohio Senate from the 15th district
- In office January 1, 1979 – January 1, 1983
- Preceded by: Robert O'Shaughnessy
- Succeeded by: Richard Pfeiffer

Personal details
- Born: John Richard Kasich Jr. May 13, 1952 (age 74) McKees Rocks, Pennsylvania, U.S.
- Party: Republican
- Spouses: Mary Lee Griffith (m. 1975; div. 1980); Karen Waldbillig (m. 1997)
- Children: 2
- Education: The Ohio State University (BA)
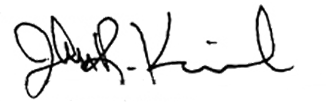
- Signature
- Kasich's voice Kasich on the Trans-Pacific Partnership. Recorded January 7, 2017

John Richard Kasich Jr. (/ˈkeɪsɪk/ KAY-sik; born May 13, 1952) is an American politician and author who was the 69th governor of Ohio from 2011 to 2019. A member of the Republican Party, he previously served as a member of the U.S. House of Representatives from 1983 to 2001, and was a candidate for the presidential nomination in 2000 and 2016.

Kasich was born and raised in McKees Rocks, Pennsylvania. He moved to Ohio in 1970 to attend Ohio State University and graduated with a bachelor's degree. After a single term in the Ohio Senate, he served nine terms as a member of the U.S. House of Representatives from Ohio's 12th congressional district. His tenure included 18 years on the House Armed Services Committee and six years as chair of the House Budget Committee. Kasich was a key figure in the passage of both 1996 welfare reform legislation and the Balanced Budget Act of 1997.

Kasich decided not to run for re-election in 2000 and ran for president instead, but withdrew from the race before the Republican primaries. After leaving Congress, Kasich hosted Heartland with John Kasich on Fox News from 2001 to 2007 and served as managing director of the Lehman Brothers office in Columbus, Ohio. He ran for governor of Ohio in 2010, defeating Democratic incumbent Ted Strickland. He was re-elected in 2014, defeating Democratic challenger Ed FitzGerald by 30 percentage points. Term-limited, he was succeeded by fellow Republican Mike DeWine.

Kasich ran for president again in 2016, finishing in fourth place in the Republican primaries behind Donald Trump, Ted Cruz, and Marco Rubio, and winning the primary in Ohio. Kasich declined to support Trump as the Republican presidential nominee and did not attend the 2016 Republican National Convention. From 2019 to 2023, Kasich was a CNN contributor, and since then has been an analyst on NBC News. Kasich is known as one of Trump's most prominent critics within the Republican Party, and endorsed Democratic presidential nominee Joe Biden for president in a speech at the 2020 Democratic National Convention.

== Early life, education, and early political career ==
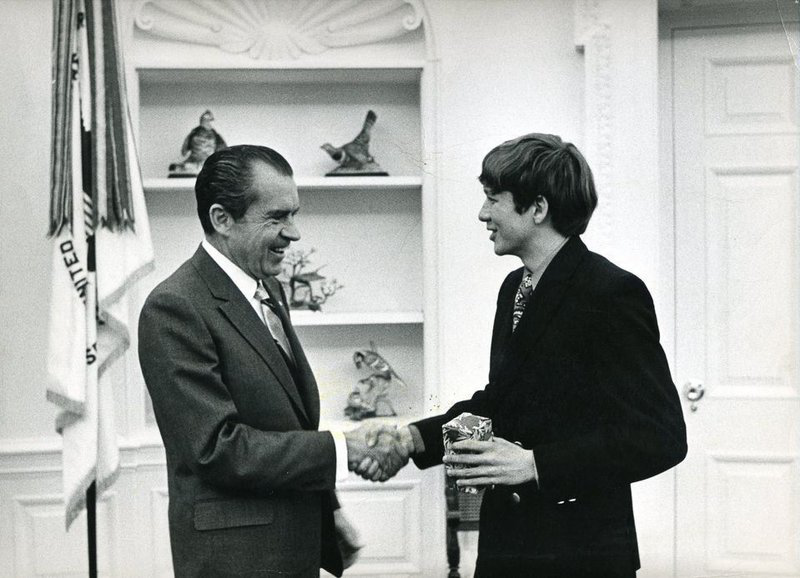
Kasich (right), aged 18, meeting President Richard Nixon in 1970 at the White House as a college freshman

John Richard Kasich Jr. was born and raised in the Pittsburgh suburb of McKees Rocks, Pennsylvania. His parents were Anne (née Vukovich; 1918–1987) and John Richard Kasich (1919–1987), who worked as a mail carrier. Kasich's father was of Czech descent, while his mother was of Croatian descent. Both parents were children of immigrants and were practicing Roman Catholics. He has described himself as "a Croatian and a Czech". His paternal grandparents were Carpatho-Rusyn immigrants from the Ung County of Czechoslovakia at the time.

After attending public schools in his hometown of McKees Rocks, Kasich moved to Columbus, Ohio, in 1970 to attend Ohio State University, where he joined the Alpha Sigma Phi fraternity. As a freshman, he wrote a letter to President Richard Nixon describing concerns he had about the nation and requesting a meeting with the President. The letter was delivered to Nixon by the university's president Novice Fawcett and Kasich was granted a 20-minute meeting with Nixon in December 1970.

Earning a Bachelor of Arts degree in political science from Ohio State in 1974, he went on to work as a researcher for the Ohio Legislative Service Commission. From 1975 to 1978, he served as an administrative assistant to then-state Senator Buz Lukens.

In 1978, Kasich ran against Democratic incumbent Robert O'Shaughnessy for Ohio Senate. A political ally of Kasich remembers him during that time as a persistent campaigner: "People said, 'If you just quit calling me, I'll support you.'" At age 26, Kasich won with 56% of the vote, beginning his four-year term representing the 15th district. Kasich was the second youngest person ever elected to the Ohio Senate. One of his first acts as a state senator was to refuse a pay raise. Republicans gained control of the State Senate in 1980, but Kasich went his own way, for example, by opposing a budget proposal he believed would raise taxes and writing his own proposal instead.

== U.S. House of Representatives (1983–2001) ==
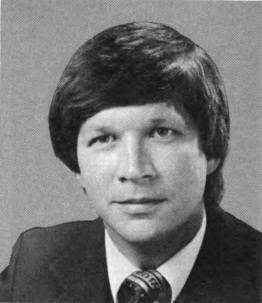
Kasich during the 99th United States Congress, 1985

In 1982, Kasich ran for Congress in Ohio's 12th congressional district, which included portions of Columbus as well as the cities of Westerville, Reynoldsburg, Worthington, and Dublin. He won the Republican primary with 83% of the vote and defeated incumbent Democratic U.S. Congressman Bob Shamansky in the general election by a margin of 50%–47%. He would never face another contest nearly that close, and was re-elected eight more times with at least 64 percent of the vote.

During his congressional career, Kasich was considered a fiscal conservative, taking aim at programs supported by Republicans and Democrats. He worked with Ralph Nader in seeking to reduce corporate tax loopholes.

Kasich was a member of the House Armed Services Committee for 18 years. He developed a "fairly hawkish" reputation on that committee, although he "also zealously challenged" defense spending he considered wasteful. Among the Pentagon projects that he targeted were the B-2 bomber program (teaming up with Democratic representative Ron Dellums to cut the program, their efforts were partly successful) and the A-12 bomber program (ultimately canceled by defense secretary Dick Cheney in 1991). He participated extensively in the passage of the Goldwater–Nichols Act of 1986, which reorganized the U.S. Department of Defense. He also pushed through the bill creating the 1988 Base Realignment and Closure Commission, which closed obsolete U.S. military bases, and successfully opposed a proposed $110 million expansion of the Pentagon building after the end of the Cold War. He also "proposed a national commission on arms control" and "urged tighter controls over substances that could be used for biological warfare."

Kasich said he was "100 percent for" the first Persian Gulf War as well as the 2001 invasion of Afghanistan, but said that he did not favor U.S. military participation in the Lebanese Civil War or in Bosnia. In 1997, with fellow Republican representative Floyd Spence, he introduced legislation (supported by some congressional Democrats) for the U.S. to pull out of a multilateral peacekeeping force in Bosnia. In the House, he supported the Comprehensive Anti-Apartheid Act, a U.S. Representative Ron Dellums (D- CA)-led initiative to impose economic sanctions against apartheid-era South Africa.

=== Ranking member of the House Budget Committee ===
In 1993, Kasich became the ranking Republican member of the House Budget Committee. Kasich and other House Budget Committee Republicans proposed an alternative to President Bill Clinton's deficit reduction bill, the Omnibus Budget Reconciliation Act of 1993. That proposal included funds to implement Republican proposals for health care, welfare, and crime control legislation and for a child tax credit. The Penny-Kasich Plan, named after Kasich and fellow lead sponsor Tim Penny, was supported by Republicans and conservative Democrats. It proposed $90 billion in spending cuts over five years, almost three times as much in cuts as the $37 billion in cuts backed by the Clinton administration and Democratic congressional leaders. About one-third ($27 billion) of the proposed Penny-Kasich cuts would come from means-testing Medicare, specifically by reducing Medicare payments to seniors who earned $75,000 or more in adjusted gross income. This angered the AARP, which lobbied against the legislation. Another $26 billion of the Penny-Kasich plan's cuts would have come from the U.S. Department of Defense and foreign aid, which led Secretary of Defense Les Aspin to say that the plan would destroy military morale. Another $27 billion in savings would have come from federal layoffs. The proposal was narrowly defeated in the House by a 219–213 vote.

As ranking member of the Budget Committee, Kasich proposed his own health care reform plan as a rival to the Clinton health care plan of 1993 championed by First Lady Hillary Clinton, but more market-based. As journalist Zeke Miller wrote in Time magazine, "The Kasich plan would have covered all Americans by 2005, using a form of an individual mandate that would have required employees to purchase insurance through their employers. (The mandate was an idea initially supported by conservative groups like The Heritage Foundation.)"

On November 17, 1993, Kasich voted to approve the North American Free Trade Agreement, casting a "yea" vote for the North American Free Trade Agreement Implementation Act.

In 1994, Kasich was one of the Republican leaders to support a last-minute deal with President Bill Clinton to pass the Federal Assault Weapons Ban. After a series of meetings with Clinton's Chief of Staff, Leon Panetta, a longtime friend of Kasich, the assault weapons ban was passed when 42 Republicans crossed party lines and voted to ban assault weapons with the Democrats. His support of the assault-weapons ban resulted in the NRA Political Victory Fund giving Kasich an "F" rating in 1994.

=== Chair of the House Budget Committee ===
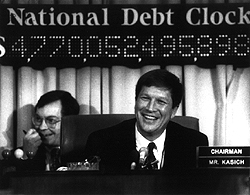
Kasich as chair of the House Budget Committee

Kasich became chair of the House Budget Committee in 1995, following the Republican Revolution in the 1994 United States House of Representatives elections. In 1996, he introduced the Personal Responsibility and Work Opportunity Act in the House, an important welfare reform bill signed into law by President Clinton.

During the 1996 presidential campaign, Republican nominee Bob Dole was reported to have considered Kasich as a vice presidential running mate but instead selected Jack Kemp, a former congressman and Secretary of Housing and Urban Development.

In 1997, Kasich rose to national prominence after becoming "the chief architect of a deal that balanced the federal budget for the first time since 1969"—the Balanced Budget Act of 1997.

In 1998, Kasich voted to impeach President Clinton on all four charges made against him. In 1999, while the Senate prepared to vote on the charges, he said: "I believe these are impeachable and removable offenses." Kasich did not seek re-election in 2000.

== Private sector career (2001–2009) ==
After leaving Congress, Kasich went to work for Fox News, hosting Heartland with John Kasich on the Fox News Channel and guest-hosting The O'Reilly Factor, filling in for Bill O'Reilly as needed. He also occasionally appeared as a guest on Hannity & Colmes.

Kasich served on the board of directors for several corporations, including Invacare Corporation and the Chicago-based Norvax Inc. In 2001, Kasich joined Lehman Brothers' investment banking division as a managing director, in Columbus, Ohio. He remained at Lehman Brothers until it declared bankruptcy in 2008. That year, Lehman Brothers paid him a $182,692 salary and a $432,200 bonus. He stated that the bonus was for work performed in 2007.

Kasich's employment by Lehman Brothers was criticized during his subsequent campaigns in light of the firm's collapse during the 2008 financial crisis. Kasich responded to critics by saying: "I wasn't involved in the inner workings of Lehman, I was a banker. I didn't go to board meetings or go and talk investment strategy with the top people. I was nowhere near that. That's like, it's sort of like being a car dealer in Zanesville and being blamed for the collapse of GM."

Republicans made efforts to recruit Kasich to run for Ohio governor in 2006, but he declined to enter the race. In 2008, Kasich formed Recharge Ohio, a political action committee (PAC) with the goal of raising money to help Republican candidates for the Ohio House of Representatives and Ohio Senate, in an effort to retain Republican majorities in the Ohio General Assembly. Kasich served as honorary chairman of the PAC.

== Governor of Ohio (2011–2019) ==
=== Elections ===
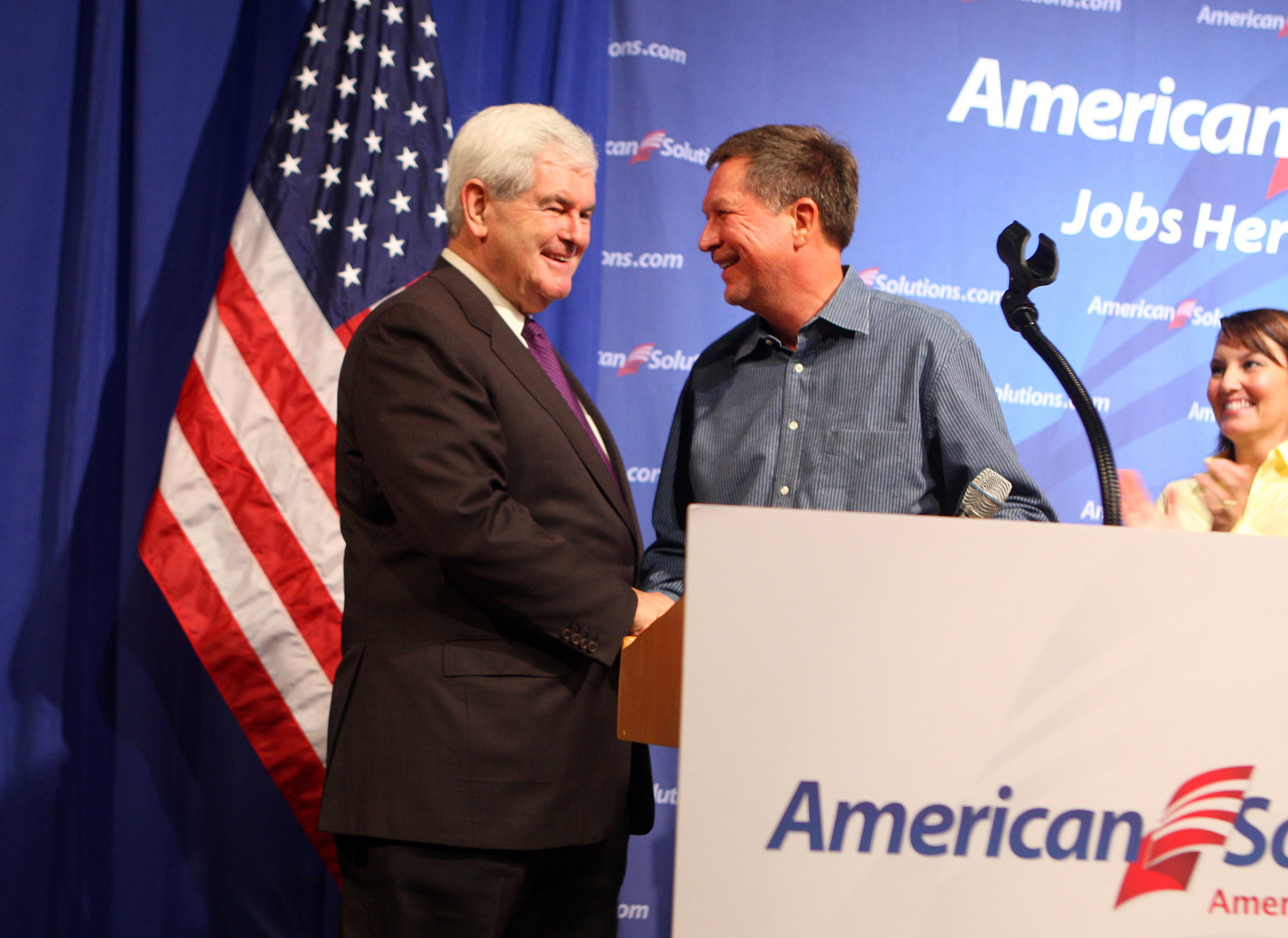
Kasich during his 2010 campaign with former Speaker Newt Gingrich

On May 1, 2009, Kasich filed papers to run for governor of Ohio against incumbent Democrat Ted Strickland. He formally announced his candidacy on June 1, 2009. On January 15, 2010, Kasich announced Ohio State Auditor Mary Taylor as his running mate.

During a speech before Ashtabula County Republicans in March 2009, Kasich talked about the need to "break the back of organized labor in the schools," according to the Ashtabula Star Beacon. Ohio teachers' unions supported Strickland, and after Kasich's gubernatorial victory, he said, "I am waiting for the teachers' unions to take out full-page ads in all the major newspapers, apologizing for what they had to say about me during this campaign." Elsewhere, he said he was willing to work with "unions that make things."

On May 4, 2010, Kasich won the Republican nomination for governor, having run unopposed. On November 2, 2010, Kasich defeated Strickland in a closely contested race to win the governorship. He was sworn in at midnight on January 10, 2011, in a private ceremony at the Ohio Statehouse in Columbus. It was then followed by a ceremonial inauguration at the Ohio Theatre at noon on the same day.

Kasich, who was elected with Tea Party support in 2010, faced some backlash from some Tea Party activists. His decision to accept the Patient Protection and Affordable Care Act's expansion of Medicaid caused some Tea Party activists to refuse to support his campaign. In November 2014, Kasich won re-election, defeating Democrat Ed FitzGerald, the county executive of Cuyahoga County, 64% to 33%. He won 86 of 88 counties.

=== Tenure ===
Kasich's tenure as governor was notable for his expansion of Medicaid under the Affordable Care Act, his work combating the opioid addiction crisis, his attempt to curtail collective bargaining for public sector employees (later reversed by Ohio voters in the 2011 Ohio Issue 2 referendum), his local government funding cuts, his passage of several anti-abortion laws, his veto of a six-week abortion ban, his tax cuts, and his evolving position on gun control. During Kasich's time as governor, Ohio ranked 22nd out of the 50 states for private-sector job growth, at 9.3%.

==== First term (2011–2015) ====
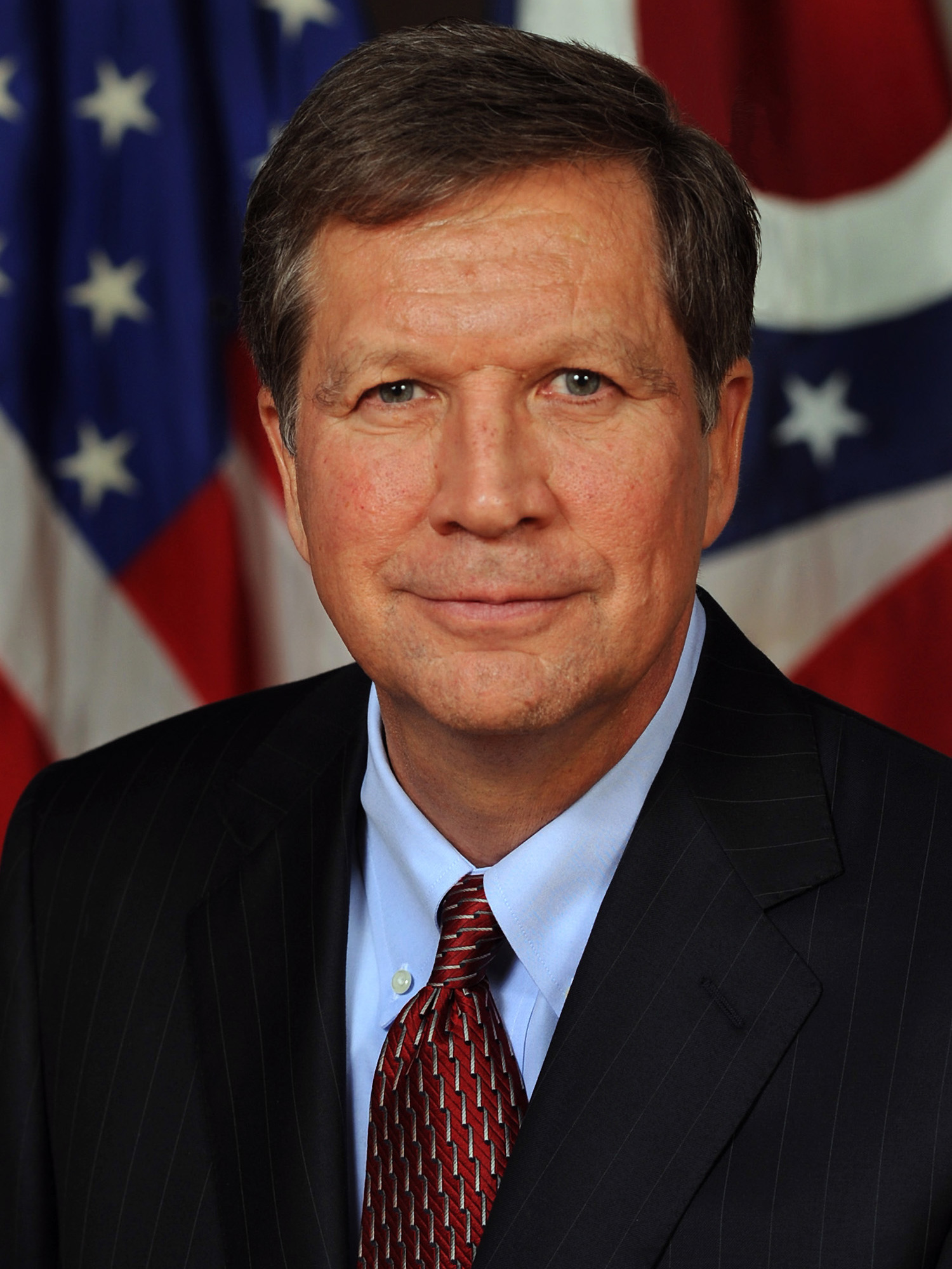
Official portrait, 2011

Kasich drew immediate criticism upon taking office in 2011 for appointing an all-white 22-member cabinet. Shortly afterward, on February 2, 2011, Kasich made his first minority appointment to the Cabinet, naming Michael Colbert, a black man, to lead the Ohio Department of Job and Family Services. That same year, he signed a budget eliminating the state estate tax effective January 1, 2013.

In March 2011, Kasich signed into law Senate Bill 5, a controversial labor law which restricted collective bargaining rights of public employees, such as police officers, firefighters, and teachers. Democrats and labor unions opposed the legislation and placed a referendum on the November 2011 ballot to repeal the law. SB 5 also "sparked numerous protests with thousands of union workers and other opponents descending on the Statehouse, mirroring similar demonstrations in Wisconsin and injecting Ohio into the national debate over Republican governors' attempts to curb public workers' collective bargaining rights." Ohio voters repealed SB 5 61% to 39%. Kasich acknowledged the result, saying "the people have spoken", and dropped further broad-based bargaining restrictions, though he later supported a narrower bill applying only to the Cleveland Metropolitan School District.

Kasich opted to accept Medicaid-expansion funding provided by the Patient Protection and Affordable Care Act (ACA or "Obamacare") in Ohio. This decision angered many Statehouse Republicans, who wanted Kasich to reject the expansion. Total Medicaid spending came in nearly $2 billion below estimates for fiscal year 2015, attributed to expanded managed care, increased in-home senior care, and an improving economy.

In 2012, Kasich appointed Judge Judith L. French to an Ohio Supreme Court vacancy and signed bipartisan legislation easing the collateral consequences of criminal conviction. In 2013, he signed a $62 billion two-year budget that included a phased 10% income tax cut, a sales tax increase from 5.5% to 5.75%, and a 50% tax cut for small business owners on the first $250,000 of net income. He used his line-item veto to preserve the Medicaid expansion. The 2013 budget also stripped $1.4 million in federal dollars from Planned Parenthood by placing the organization last on the priority list for family-planning funds; provided funding to crisis pregnancy centers; and required women seeking abortions to undergo ultrasounds. The budget also barred abortion providers from entering into emergency transfer agreements with public hospitals, requiring abortion providers to find private hospitals willing to enter into transfer agreements.

In 2014, Kasich signed into law a bill freezing Ohio's renewable portfolio standard (RPS) program for two years. In March 2014, in an effort to address the opioid epidemic, Kasich signed legislation (passed unanimously in both chambers of the state legislature) expanding the availability of naloxone, a lifesaving antidote to opioid overdoses. The measure allowed friends and family members of addicts to obtain access to naloxone and for first responders to carry naloxone. In July 2015, Kasich signed legislation further expanding the availability of naloxone, making it available without a prescription.

Also in 2014, Kasich signed a bill cutting six days from Ohio's early voting period, including the "golden week" (a period at the beginning of early voting when voters could both register to vote and cast an in-person absentee ballot). The measures were hotly contested in the state legislature, passing on a party-line vote, with Republicans in favor and Democrats opposed. This measure prompted two federal lawsuits. The first lawsuit, brought by the American Civil Liberties Union of Ohio on behalf of the NAACP and League of Women Voters of Ohio, resulted in a settlement in April 2015, in which the state agreed to provide evening and Sunday hours for early voting in elections in Ohio through 2018. The second lawsuit, Ohio Democratic Party v. Husted, was brought in May 2015 by Democratic election lawyer Marc Elias; plaintiffs argued that the Ohio bill eliminating "golden week" violated the Constitution and the Voting Rights Act because it disproportionately burdened black, Latino and young voters. The federal district court agreed and struck down the legislation, but the U.S. Court of Appeals for the Sixth Circuit reversed that decision in a 2–1 vote, and the U.S. Supreme Court declined to hear an appeal.

==== Second term (2015–2019) ====
In 2015, Kasich signed into law a $71 billion two-year state budget after using his line-item veto power to veto 44 items. The overall 2015 budget provides a 6.3 percent state income-tax cut as a part one component of a $1.9 billion net tax reduction and lowers the top income-tax rate to slightly below 5 percent. The budget also "spends $955 million more in basic state aid for K-12 schools than the last two-year period"; "boosts state funding for higher education to help offset a two-year tuition freeze at public universities"; expands the Medicaid health program; increases cigarette taxes by 35 cents a pack; and "prohibits independent health care and child care workers under contract with the state from unionizing." Kasich's budget also proposed raising the tax rate on hydraulic fracturing (fracking) activities. Specifically, Kasich's plan called for imposing a 6.5 percent severance tax on crude oil and natural gas extracted via horizontal drilling and sold at the source (about $3.25 per $50 barrel of oil), and for an additional 4.5 percent tax per thousand cubic feet on natural gas and liquefied natural gas (about $0.16 per thousand cubic feet).

In April 2015, Kasich signed a two-year transportation budget bill which allocated $7.06 billion for highway construction and maintenance, $600 million to local governments for road and bridge projects, and an additional million over the last budget for public transportation. He also signed a bill aimed at protecting Lake Erie's water quality. The bill places restrictions on the spread of manure and other fertilizers that contribute to toxic algal blooms and requires large public water treatment plants to monitor phosphorus levels. The bill had been unanimously approved by both chambers of the Ohio Legislature the previous month.

In the same month, Kasich used his line-item veto power to veto a provision added to a highway-budget bill by Republicans in the state legislature that would have required college students who register to vote in Ohio to obtain a state driver's license and vehicle registration, imposing an estimated $75 in motor vehicle costs on out-of-state college students who wanted to vote in the state. The veto was celebrated by voting rights advocates, Ohio Democrats, and the Cleveland Plain Dealer editorial board, which viewed the proposal as effectively a "poll tax" motivated by a partisan desire to limit college-town voting.

In May 2015, Kasich rescinded executive orders issued by his predecessor Ted Strickland in 2007 and 2008 that provided the right to home health care contractors and in-home child care contractors to collectively bargain with the state.

In 2016, Kasich broke with fellow Republicans in the state legislature by vetoing their attempt to continue blocking the RPS standards; as a result, the freeze ended on December 31, 2016, and the clean-energy mandate resumed. This veto won Kasich praise from environmentalist groups, and angered Republicans in the state legislature. The proposed state budget also included $61.7 million for addiction treatment services for prisoners.

As governor, Kasich presided over the executions of fifteen inmates and commuted the death sentences of seven inmates. In January 2015, Kasich announced that, due to pending litigation and other issues, he was delaying all seven executions scheduled through January 2016. The delay was largely attributed to European pharmaceutical companies, which have refused to supply the state with deadly drugs necessary for executions. In February 2017, Kasich again delayed Ohio executions for an additional three months, after a federal judge ruled that Ohio's three-drug lethal injection protocol is unconstitutional. The last execution in Ohio took place in July 2018.

In December 2016, Kasich approved a ban on abortions after 20 weeks, except when a pregnancy endangers a woman's life, but vetoed a six-week abortion ban. Kasich cited the cost to taxpayers of defending the legislation in court, and the likelihood that the six-week bill would be struck down in federal court as reasons for vetoing the more restrictive bill. In December 2018, Kasich again vetoed a proposed six-week abortion ban, citing the cost to taxpayers and previous rulings by the federal courts. He did sign a bill into law that bans the dilation and evacuation procedure commonly used for abortion.

In December 2018, Kasich signed an executive order extending non-discrimination protections for gender identity, including trans and non-binary identities, to state employees in Ohio.

== Presidential campaigns ==
=== 2000 campaign ===
In February 1999, Kasich formed an exploratory committee to run for president. In March 1999 he announced his campaign for the Republican nomination. He was one of the youngest candidates in the Republican primaries and portrayed himself as a fresh face.

After very poor fundraising, he dropped out in July 1999, before the Iowa Straw Poll, and endorsed Governor George W. Bush of Texas.

=== 2016 campaign ===
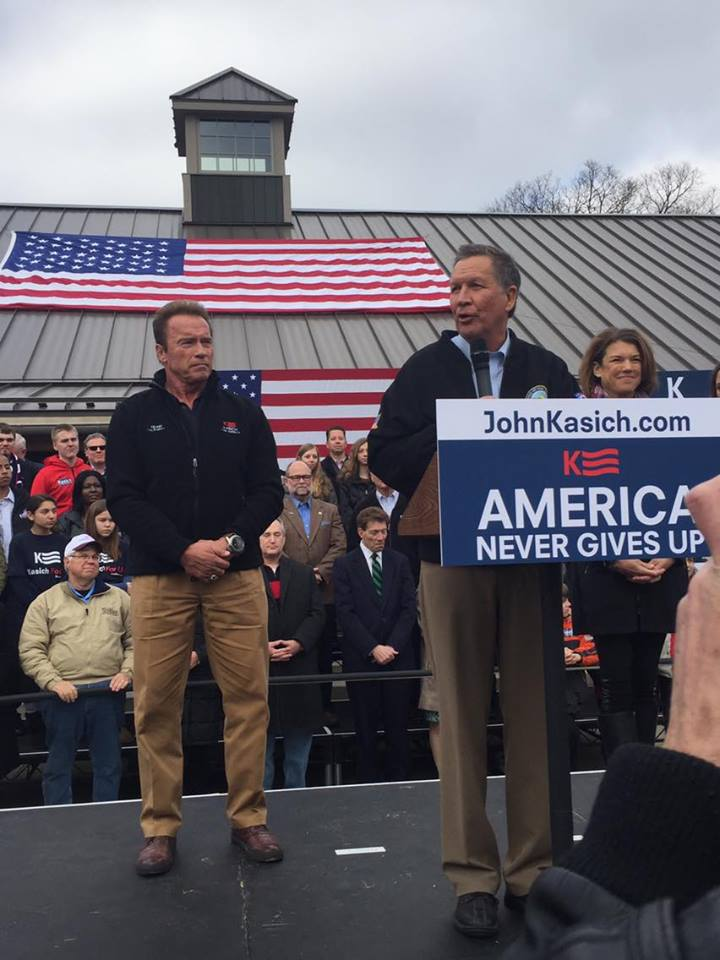
Governor Arnold Schwarzenegger endorsing John Kasich for president

On July 21, 2015, Kasich announced his candidacy for the Republican presidential nomination during a speech at the Ohio Union, the student union of his alma mater, the Ohio State University. On January 30, 2016, The New York Times endorsed Kasich for the Republican nomination, rebuking leading candidates Donald Trump and Senator Ted Cruz and wrote that Kasich, "though a distinct underdog, is the only plausible choice for Republicans tired of the extremism and inexperience on display in this race."

On the campaign trail, Kasich sought to project a sunny, optimistic message, describing himself as "the prince of light and hope." This marked a change in tone for Kasich, who had developed a reputation as an abrasive governor. Viewed as a long-shot contender, Kasich took an "above-the-fray approach to his rivals" and "ran unapologetically as a candidate with experience" even as others ran as "outsider" contenders.

Kasich came in second place in the New Hampshire primary on February 9, 2016, behind winner Trump. The Cincinnati Enquirer reported that this was "the best possible result" for Kasich and lent "credence to the notion that he can emerge" as a Republican alternative to Trump and Cruz. Ultimately, however, Kasich's message "never caught on in a campaign that ... exposed the anger and frustration coursing through the electorate" and he "found himself stuck in fourth place in a three-man race, trailing Senator Marco Rubio of Florida in the delegate count" although Rubio had dropped out of the race in March.

The only state won by Kasich was his home state of Ohio, which gave him 66 delegates in its March 2016 winner-take-all primary but still left him with "a steep delegate deficit against his rivals." He suspended his campaign on May 4, 2016, one day after Trump won the Indiana primary, leaving Trump as the party's presumptive nominee. A 2018 study on media coverage of the 2016 election noted "the paradox of the Kasich campaign's longevity while it lacked public interest provides some evidence for the idea that Kasich's biggest supporters were the media".

Following his withdrawal from the race, Kasich did not extend his support to Trump, calling him a divisive figure rather than a "unifier" and ruled out the possibility of seeking the vice presidency as Trump's running mate. Kasich said it was "hard to say" whether he would ever endorse Trump, having ruled out voting for Democratic nominee Hillary Clinton but lacking the enthusiasm to fully back Trump.

In August 2016, Kasich repeated an earlier claim that the Trump campaign had offered him a powerful vice presidency, "putting him in charge of all domestic and foreign policy". The Trump campaign denied that such an offer had been made. Kasich also doubted whether Trump could win Ohio, a critical state in the election. It was speculated that Kasich was looking towards a 2020 campaign. This speculation was strengthened by a report that Kasich had planned to give a speech to the American Enterprise Institute less than 48 hours after the election but cancelled it the morning after the election when it was clear that Trump had won.

Kasich received an electoral vote in the general election from one faithless elector, Christopher Suprun of Texas, who had been pledged to vote for Trump. An elector in Colorado also attempted to vote for him, but that vote was discarded; the elector was replaced by an alternate elector who voted, as pledged, for Clinton.

== Political positions ==
Kasich is considered by some to be a moderate Republican due to his strong condemnation of far-right and populist conservatives and his opposition to Donald Trump. However, his record in the House and as governor of Ohio has led others to point out that his views place him to the right of most moderate politicians. Larry Sabato, the director of the University of Virginia Center for Politics, who has known Kasich for years, says that "If you had asked me in the 90s about Kasich I would have said he was a Gingrich conservative." Kasich's friend Curt Steiner, former chief of staff to former Republican Ohio governor and U.S. senator George Voinovich, described Kasich as a "solid Republican" with "an independent streak."

=== Economic policy ===
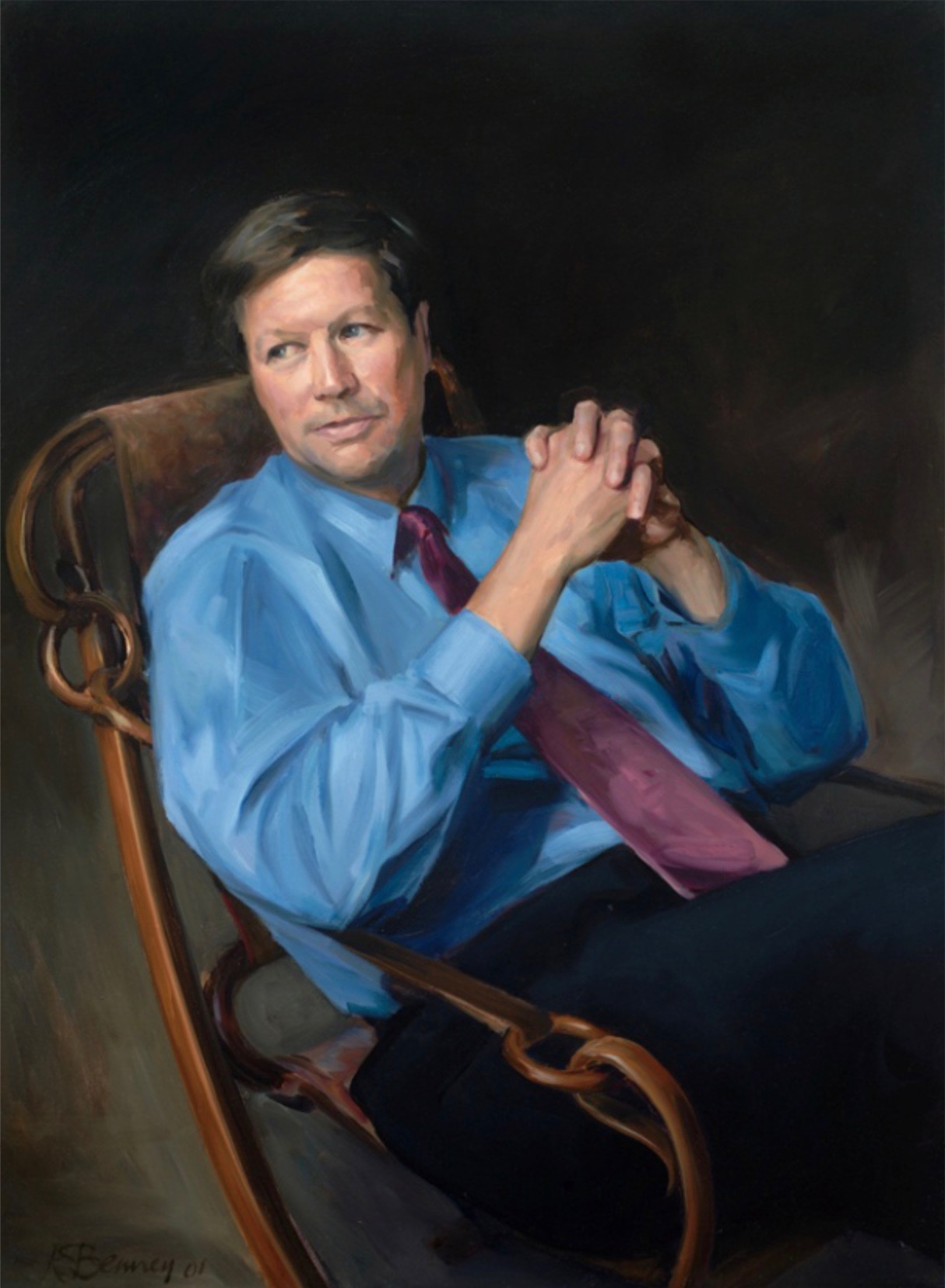
Official congressional portrait of Kasich as chairman of the House Budget committee

During Kasich's tenure, Ohio eliminated a budget shortfall that his administration has estimated at $8 billion, but which the Cleveland Plain Dealer estimated at closer to $6 billion. (The New York Times put the number at $7.7 billion). Ohio also increased its "rainy day fund" from effectively zero to more than $2 billion. Kasich "closed the budget shortfall in part by cutting aid to local governments, forcing some of them to raise their own taxes or cut services. And increasing sales taxes helped make the income tax cuts possible." An analysis by the Plain Dealer in March 2016 found that more than 70 cities and villages had lost at least $1 million a year due to Kasich's budget and taxation policy.

In March 2008, Kasich called for "phasing out" Ohio's state income tax.

Kasich has campaigned for a balanced budget amendment to the U.S. Constitution. Kasich created a 501(c)(4) group, Balanced Budget Forever, to promote the cause.

Kasich said in 2016 that "I have never been an ideological supporter of free trade," but has long supported free trade agreements. He is a strong supporter of the Trans-Pacific Partnership, and participated with others in a meeting with President Obama in support of the agreement.

=== Environmental policy ===
In a speech in April 2012, Kasich acknowledged that climate change is real and is a problem. In the same speech, however, Kasich said that the Environmental Protection Agency should not regulate carbon emissions and that instead states and private companies should be in charge of regulating coal-fired power plant emissions. In 2015, Kasich stated that he did not know all the causes of climate change, and that he did not know the extent to which humans contribute to climate change.

Kasich formerly supported fracking in Ohio state parks and forests, signing legislation in mid-2011 authorizing him to appoint a five-member commission to oversee the leasing of mineral rights on state land to the highest bidders. In 2012, Kasich aides planned a campaign with a stated goal to "marginalize the effectiveness of communications by adversaries about the initiative" to bring fracking to state parks and forests, naming in an email the Ohio Sierra Club and state Representatives Robert F. Hagan and Nickie Antonio as adversaries of the plan. Kasich never appointed the commission, and the promotional plan was never put into effect. A memo and email relating to the 2012 promotional campaign were publicly released for the first time in February 2015, which according to the Columbus Dispatch attracted criticism from state environmental and liberal groups, as well as Democratic state legislators, who called for an investigation. On the same day the governor reversed himself, with a spokesman saying, "At this point, the governor doesn't support fracking in state parks. We reserve the right to revisit that, but it's not what he wants to do right now, and that's been his position for the past year and a half."

Kasich supported the Keystone XL oil pipeline project and, along with other Republican governors, signed an open letter in February 2015 urging federal approval for the project. In 2016, in response to a request from South Dakota under the terms of an interstate compact, Kasich dispatched 37 Ohio state troopers to South Dakota, where they were stationed around Dakota Access Pipeline protests near the Standing Rock Sioux Reservation. This controversial deployment prompted unsuccessful petitions to Kasich from members of the public, Cincinnati City Council members, environmentalists, and some state legislators who asked Kasich to recall the troopers.

=== Education ===
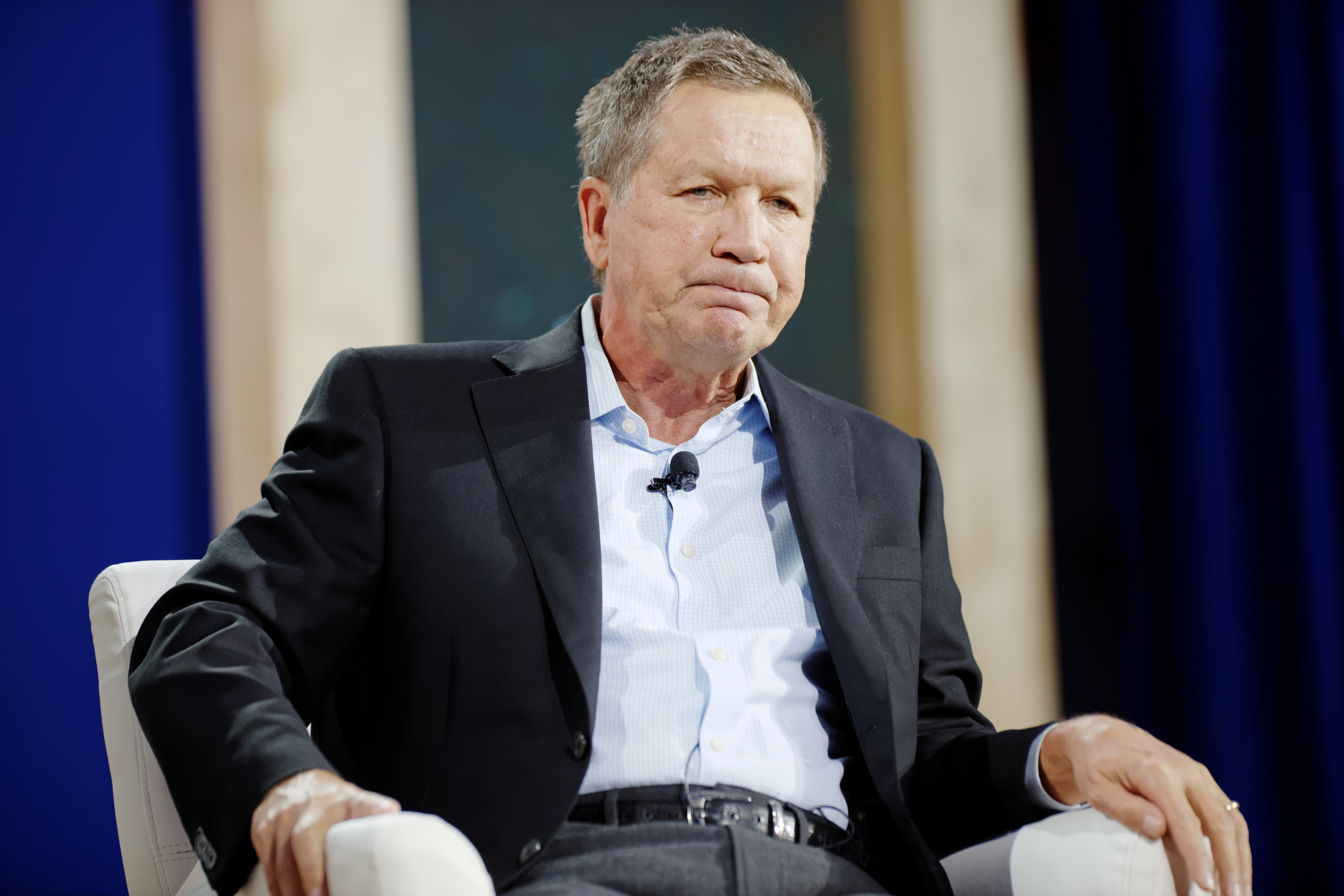
Kasich at the New Hampshire Education Summit in 2015

During Kasich's tenure as governor, he pushed to expand charter schools, increase the number of school vouchers that use public money to pay for tuition at private schools, implement a "merit pay" scheme for teachers, and evaluate teachers by student standardized test scores in math and reading. He canceled the school-funding formula put into place by his Democratic predecessor, Governor Ted Strickland.

Kasich supports the Common Core State Standards and has criticized Republicans who turned against it. Funding for traditional public schools declined by about $500 million during his governorship, while funding for charter schools has increased at least 27 percent. Analysts disagree "on whether Kasich's education budgets give increases beyond inflation." In the 2015 state budget, Kasich used his line-item veto power "to cut more than $84 million of funding from public schools."

According to a September 2014 story in the Columbus Dispatch, Kasich favored allowing public school districts "to teach alternatives to evolution—such as intelligent design—if local school officials want to, under the philosophy of 'local control.'"

In 2011, Kasich had the idea of establishing a Holocaust memorial on the grounds of the Ohio Statehouse. Kasich successfully secured approval of the proposal from the Capital Square Review and Advisory Board. The $2 million Ohio Holocaust and Liberators Memorial, designed by Daniel Libeskind, is located across from the Ohio Theatre; the memorial was dedicated in 2014.

=== Civil liberties and electronic surveillance ===
In speaking in the 2016 campaign on domestic surveillance, Kasich has "straddled the line," praising Rand Paul for saying that "we need to get warrants," but also saying "if there's information they need, the government needs to get it." Kasich has said there needs to be "a balance between good intelligence and the need to protect Americans from what can become an aggressive government somewhere down the road."

On one occasion, Kasich spoke out against proposals to mandate that technology companies provide a "backdoor" for the government to access encrypted devices, saying that this could end up aiding hackers. On a subsequent occasion, Kasich said that encryption was dangerous because it could stymie government antiterrorism investigations.

Kasich has condemned whistleblower Edward Snowden as a traitor. In July 2015, Kasich said that it was "pure demagoguery" for Hillary Clinton to "say that there are Republicans who are deliberately trying to keep people from voting."

=== Foreign policy ===
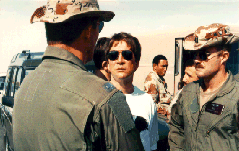
Kasich consults with military leaders during the Gulf War

In November 2002, Kasich urged the invasion of Iraq, telling a crowd of students at Ohio State University: "We should go to war with Iraq. It's not likely that (Saddam) Hussein will give up his weapons. If he did he would be disgraced in the Arab world." In an interview in August 2015, Kasich said: "I would never have committed ourselves to Iraq." A Kasich spokesman subsequently said that "Kasich was not revising history" but was instead saying that the Iraq War was a mistake given the facts available now. Kasich has said that the U.S. "should've left a base in Iraq" instead of withdrawing troops in 2011.

In 2015, Kasich said that airstrikes were insufficient to combat the Islamic State of Iraq and the Levant, and he would send U.S. ground troops to fight ISIL. Kasich has expressed support for the U.S.'s drone program. He has said, however, that the program should be overseen by the Department of Defense, and not by the CIA.

Kasich favors strong relations between the U.S. and its NATO allies. He supported Senator John McCain's call for maintaining existing U.S. sanctions on Russia, and condemned the Trump administration's consideration of lifting sanctions. Like McCain, Kasich supports imposing "tougher sanctions against Russia and Putin's inner circle." He supports a bipartisan investigation into Russian interference in the 2016 United States elections. Kasich supports continued U.S. support of Saudi Arabia, but he criticized Saudi Arabia's "funding and teaching of radical clerics who are the very people who try to destroy us".

Kasich opposed the landmark 2015 international nuclear agreement with Iran, and in September 2015 was one of fourteen Republican governors who sent a letter to President Obama stating "that we intend to ensure that the various state-level sanctions [against Iran] that are now in effect remain in effect," despite the agreement. In November 2015, Kasich said that if elected president, he "would send a carrier battle group through the South China Sea" to send a message to China regarding their claims of sovereignty there.

=== Health care ===
Kasich opposes abortion except in cases of rape, incest, and danger to the mother's life. As governor, he signed 18 abortion-restrictive measures into law. In 2015, Kasich said in an interview that Planned Parenthood "ought to be de-funded", but added that Republicans in Congress should not force a government shutdown over the issue.

Kasich opted to accept Medicaid-expansion funding provided by the Patient Protection and Affordable Care Act (ACA or "Obamacare") in Ohio. In an October 2014 interview, Kasich said that repeal of the ACA was "not gonna happen" and stated that "The opposition to it was really either political or ideological. I don't think that holds water against real flesh and blood, and real improvements in people's lives." Kasich later said that he was referring solely to the law's Medicaid expansion, and that "my position is that we need to repeal and replace" the rest of the law. In 2015, Kasich expressed support for many provisions of the ACA (ensuring coverage for people with preexisting conditions, the use of insurance exchanges, and Medicaid expansion), but opposed mandates.

In 2017, after Donald Trump took office and congressional Republicans maneuvered to repeal the ACA, Kasich criticized Republican hard-liners in Congress who demanded a full ACA repeal, saying that full repeal was "not acceptable" when 20 million people gained insurance under the ACA and that doing so would be a "political impossibility." Kasich urged that the Medicaid expansion be preserved in some form, criticizing the House Republican legislation that would cut the Medicaid expansion and phase out health insurance subsidies for low-income Americans. Kasich said that the nation's "soul" was at stake if Republicans passed legislation that left millions without health insurance. After the failure of the House Republican health-care legislation, Kasich met in Washington with members of the Republican Tuesday Group and urged fellow Republicans to work with Democrats to make more modest changes to the Affordable Care Act. In May 2017, Kasich said that the version of the Republican health care bill that passed the House was "inadequate" and would harm patients; Kasich said that Republicans "should've worked with the Democrats" on the bill rather than passing legislation merely to fulfill a campaign pledge.

In June 2017, Kasich said that he didn't "have a problem" with gradually phasing out the ACA's expansion of Medicaid over a seven-year period, but only if Congress provided states with significantly more, more than the House Republican bill provided for, and only if Congress granted states more authority to manage the program. Along with three other Republican governors (Asa Hutchinson of Arkansas, Brian Sandoval of Nevada, and Rick Snyder of Michigan), Kasich signed a letter to Senate Majority Leader Mitch McConnell with an outline of their wishes for a health care bill. Kasich and the others specifically called upon Congress to "end the requirement that state Medicaid programs cover nearly every prescription drug approved by the Food and Drug Administration." Kasich and the other governors' views were seen as influential, because their states have Republican senators and the Republicans have only a narrow majority in the Senate.

=== Immigration ===
In 2010, while running for governor, Kasich expressed support for amending the U.S. Constitution to abolish the Fourteenth Amendment's guarantee of jus soli (birthright) citizenship for people born in the United States. Kasich also told the Columbus Dispatch at the time that "One thing that I don't want to reward is illegal immigration."

In 2014, Kasich acknowledged that his stance on immigration has "evolved" because "maybe [I'm] a little smarter now", stating "I don't want to see anybody in pain. So I guess when I look at this now, I look at it differently than I did in '10. ... When I look at a group of people who might be hiding, who may be afraid, who may be scared, who have children, I don't want to be in a position of where I make it worse for them." That year, Kasich expressed openness to a path to citizenship for undocumented immigrants, saying at a Republican Governors Association (RGA) meeting in Florida, "I don't like the idea of citizenship when people jump the line, [but] we may have to do it." Kasich was the only governor at the RGA conference "to express openly a willingness to create a pathway to citizenship for undocumented immigrants."

In August 2015, while running for president, Kasich called for a path to legal status (but not necessarily citizenship) for undocumented immigrants and for a guest worker program. Kasich also appeared to disavow his earlier stance against birthright citizenship, stating "I don't think we need to go there"; called for completion of a fence along the U.S.-Mexico border; and noted that undocumented immigrants who were brought to the U.S. as young children may obtain driver's licenses in Ohio.

In October 2015, Kasich criticized Donald Trump's "plan to build a wall along the Mexican border and remove immigrants who entered the United States illegally", calling these notions "just crazy".

In September 2015, Kasich said that the U.S. had a moral responsibility to accept refugees fleeing war and violence in Syria. Subsequently, however, Kasich moved to the right, and in November 2015 wrote a letter to President Obama asking that no additional Syrian refugees be resettled in Ohio. Kasich opposed Trump's executive order on travel and immigration, which Trump signed one week after taking office in January 2017. Kasich said that the order was "ham-handed" because it "sowed so much confusion" and "sent a message that somehow the United States was looking sideways at Muslims".

=== LGBT rights ===
By the mid-2010s, Kasich had shown much more support for LGBT rights than many of his Republican counterparts. However, during his time in Congress, Kasich was much less accepting, and voted for the Defense of Marriage Act, which barred federal recognition of same-sex marriage. During this period, Kasich supported a ban on same-sex marriage in Ohio and stated that he did not approve of the "gay lifestyle." As governor of Ohio, Kasich signed an executive order banning discrimination on the basis of sexual orientation for state employees; this was more narrow than the previous executive order signed by his predecessor because it omitted protections for gender identity.

During the 2016 presidential campaign, Kasich struck a more moderate tone compared to his Republican opponents. In June 2015, following the U.S. Supreme Court's decision in Obergefell v. Hodges, which held that there is a fundamental right to same-sex marriage under the Fourteenth Amendment, Kasich said that he was "obviously disappointed" and that he believes in "traditional marriage," but that the ruling was "the law of the land and we'll abide by it" and that it was "time to move on" to other issues. During his time as Ohio governor, Kasich appointed Richard Hodges as Ohio Director of Health, who was the lead-respondent in the case.

Kasich indicated that he did not support an amendment to the U.S. Constitution to overturn the decision. In response to a debate question about how he would explain his position on same-sex marriage to one of his daughters if she were gay, Kasich responded, "The court has ruled, and I said we'll accept it. And guess what, I just went to a wedding of a friend of mine who happens to be gay. Because somebody doesn't think the way I do doesn't mean that I can't care about them or can't love them. So if one of my daughters happened to be that, of course I would love them and I would accept them. Because you know what? That's what we're taught when we have strong faith."

In September 2015, Kasich commented on the highly publicized case of Kim Davis (the Rowan County, Kentucky clerk who refused to comply with a federal court order directing her to issue marriage licenses to same-sex couples), saying: "Now, I respect the fact that this lady doesn't agree but she's also a government employee, she's not running a church, I wouldn't force this on a church. But in terms of her responsibility I think she has to comply. I don't think — I don't like the fact that she's sitting in a jail, that's absurd as well. But I think she should follow the law."

In a March 2018 interview on The Rubin Report, Kasich passively came out in support of same-sex marriage saying "I'm fine with it," but stated that he now preferred to show himself as someone in the "Billy Graham tradition" that "avoided social issues".

=== Gun policy ===
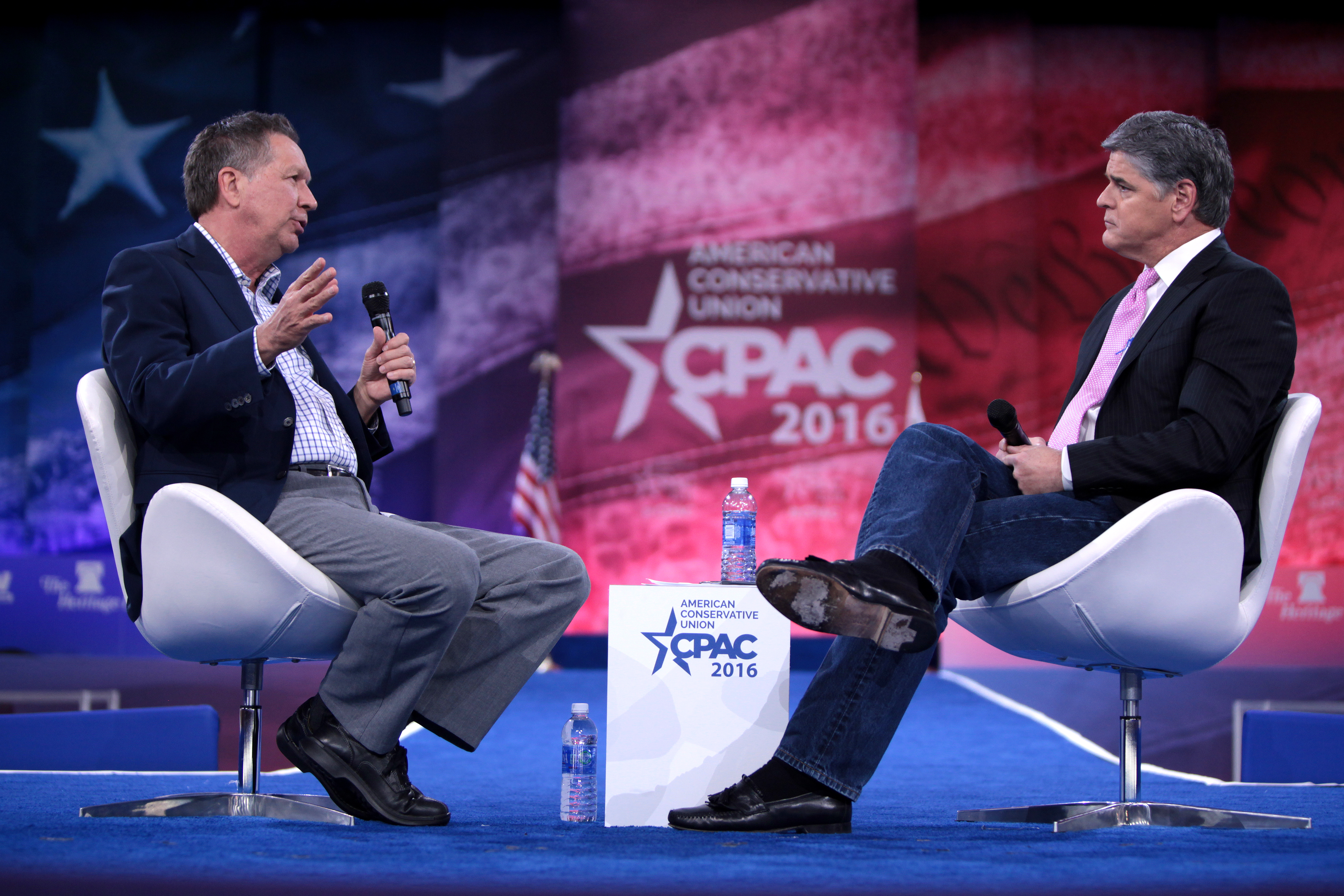
Kasich speaking with Sean Hannity at the 2016 Conservative Political Action Conference

While in the U.S. House of Representatives, Kasich had a mixed record on gun policy. He was one of 215 Representatives to vote for the Federal Assault Weapons Ban, which became law in 1994, but voted against the Brady Handgun Violence Prevention Act ("Brady Bill"), which established current background check laws.

As governor, Kasich shifted to more pro-gun positions. In 2011, he signed one bill permitting concealed handguns in bars and another making it easier for people with misdemeanor drug convictions to purchase guns. In 2012, Kasich signed a bill allowing gun owners to transport weapons with loaded magazines in their vehicles and expanding concealed carry permit reciprocity. In December 2014, Kasich signed legislation that reduced the numbers of hours of training required to obtain a concealed carry permit and eliminated the training requirement for permit renewals.

After the Stoneman Douglas High School shooting in February 2018, Kasich called for restrictions on the sales of AR-15 style rifles.

=== Transportation ===
Throughout his first gubernatorial campaign, Kasich opposed the Ohio Hub higher-speed passenger rail project (a proposed 258-mile Cleveland-to-Cincinnati train) and promised to cancel it, claiming that it would average speeds of merely 36 mph. In his first press conference following his election victory, Kasich declared "That train is dead...I said it during the campaign: It is dead."

As governor-elect, Kasich lobbied the federal government to use $400 million in federal dollars allocated for high-speed rail for freight rail projects instead. In a November 2010 letter to Kasich, Transportation Secretary Ray LaHood wrote that the federal funding was specifically allocated by the 2009 economic stimulus act for high-speed rail, and could not be used for other purposes. In a December 2010 meeting with President Barack Obama, Kasich again unsuccessfully lobbied to use the grant money for freight rail rather than high-speed rail.

In December 2010, the U.S. Department of Transportation announced that Ohio would lose the $385 million in grant funds allocated for high-speed passenger rail, since Kasich had informed them that he had no intention of ever building high-speed rail projects. (Almost $15 million had already been spent for preliminary engineering.) The $385 million was instead diverted to other states, such as California, New York, and Florida, which planned high-speed rail using the grant money for its congressionally intended purpose. Outgoing governor Ted Strickland, who championed the project, expressed disappointment, saying that the loss of funding for the project was "one of the saddest days during my four years as governor" and that "I can't understand the logic of giving up these vital, job-creating resources to California and Florida at a time when so many Ohioans need jobs."

Kasich was an opponent of the Cincinnati Streetcar project.

=== Policing and criminal justice ===
To offset a state budget deficit, Kasich proposed selling five state prisons to the for-profit prison industry. The Lake Erie prison was sold for $72.7 million to the Corrections Corporation of America (CCA), generating savings of $3 million. Kasich's Director of Corrections, Gary Mohr, whom he had hired in January 2011, had previously worked for CCA, but he said that he removed himself from the sales process. In an audit in October 2012, CCA was cited for 47 contractual violations, and failed a second audit later that year. In July 2015, the Kasich administration announced its intent to sell the North Central Correctional Institution at Marion, in order to recoup the state's original investment in the facility and invest the proceeds in community-based alternatives to prison.

Following the separate fatal police shootings of John Crawford III and Tamir Rice, a 12-year-old boy in Ohio, while each were holding BB guns, grand juries decided not to indict any of the officers involved. Following this, Kasich created the Ohio Collaborative Community-Police Advisory Board "to address what he described as frustration and distrust among some Ohioans toward their police departments, particularly among the black community." The 23-member task force (with 18 members appointed by Kasich) was appointed in January 2015 and issued its 629-page final report and recommendations in April 2015. The report recommended greater accountability and oversight for police agencies and officers, further community education and involvement in policing, and new use-of-force and recruitment, hiring, and training standards for police agencies. In August 2015, Kasich said that he was open to the idea of requiring police officers to wear body cameras.

Kasich used his power of executive clemency sparingly. He has the lowest clemency rate of any Ohio governor since at least the 1980s, when records began to be kept. In six years in office, Kasich granted 86 of the 2,291 requests that he acted upon. In 2016, Kasich granted executive clemency to 13 people; in all of the cases, the Ohio Adult Parole Authority had recommended clemency.

Kasich supports various criminal justice reform efforts; according to conservative Washington Post columnist George Will, Kasich "favors fewer mandatory minimum sentences and has instituted prison policies that prepare inmates for re-integration into communities." In 2011, Kasich signed sentencing reform legislation which allowed judges to sentence defendants convicted of non-violent fourth- and fifth-degree felonies to "community-based halfway house facilities" instead of prison; expanded the earned credit system to allow inmates to reduce their sentences; and allowed felons who have already served 80 percent or more of their sentences to be immediately released.

In September 2014, Kasich touted the Ohio's prison system's recidivism rate, which was one of the lowest in the nation. U.S. Senator Rob Portman, a Republican, attributed a drop in Ohio's recidivism rate "to the bipartisan work of the state legislature, Governor Kasich, Ohio's reentry leaders and the success of programs made possible at the federal level by the Second Chance Act," which Portman sponsored.

Kasich initially expressed opposition to medical marijuana in 2012, saying "There's better ways to help people who are in pain." However, in late 2015 and early 2016, Kasich said he was open to the legalization of medical marijuana. In a 2015 interview with radio talk show host Hugh Hewitt, Kasich said he was opposed to the legalization of recreational marijuana and equated the drug to heroin, stating: "In my state and across this country, if I happened to be president, I would lead a significant campaign down at the grassroots level to stomp these drugs out of our country."

When Kasich was asked by Hewitt whether, if elected president, he would federally enforce marijuana laws in states which have legalized marijuana, Kasich characterized it as a states' rights issue and said that "I'd have to think about it." When asked the same question later in 2015, Kasich said: "I would try to discourage the states from doing it ... but I would be tempted to say I don't think we can go and start disrupting what they've decided." Kasich opposed Issue 3, an Ohio ballot measure in 2015 that proposed the legalization of recreational marijuana, saying it was a "terrible idea".

=== Impeachment of Donald Trump ===
On October 18, 2019, Kasich publicly stated that Donald Trump should be impeached. He had previously said there was not enough evidence to impeach the President.

== Opposition to Trump ==
In February 2017, Kasich met with Trump at the White House in a private meeting that followed a bitter feud. Kasich indicated that he hoped for Trump's success, but would continue to be critical when he thought it was necessary. The same month, Kasich's chief political advisors launched a political group, Two Paths America, in an effort to promote Kasich and his views and draw a contrast with Trump. In April 2017, Kasich also released a book, Two Paths: America Divided or United, written with Daniel Paisner. The creation of the group prompted speculation he could possibly run for president again, but Kasich said that he had no plans to seek elected office in the future.

In April 2017, during a CNN town hall, Kasich, while stating that he was "very unlikely" to do so, reopened the possibility that he might run for president in 2020. On August 20, however, he reiterated his previous statement that he had no plans to run; rather, he stated that he was "rooting for [Trump] to get it together."

In October 2017, during an interview with CNN's Jake Tapper, Kasich said he had not "given up" on the Republican Party, but added that "if the party can't be fixed ... I'm not going to be able to support the party. Period. That's the end of it." In March 2018, he told The Weekly Standard that he was "increasingly open" to running for president in the 2020 presidential election; however, in May 2019, he again declared that he would not seek the presidency in 2020.

In October 2019, Kasich expressed support for the impeachment inquiry against Trump, saying that the "final straw" for him was when Trump's acting chief of staff Mick Mulvaney admitted that Trump had withheld U.S. aid from Ukraine in part to pressure the country to investigate Trump's domestic political rivals, a statement that Mulvaney later said was misconstrued.

Kasich confirmed on August 10, 2020, that he would be speaking at the 2020 Democratic National Convention in support of presumptive Democratic presidential nominee Joe Biden. Kasich said that his conscience compelled him to speak out against Trump and in support of Biden, even if it resulted in blowback against him, adding, "I've been a reformer almost all of my life. I've been very independent and I'm a Republican but the Republican Party has always been my vehicle but never my master. You have to do what you think is right in your heart and I'm comfortable here."

In September 2024, Kasich was one of several former governors to sign an open letter to all 50 current governors urging them to certify their states' votes after the upcoming November election, even if Trump urged them not to.

== Personal life ==
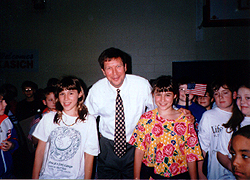
Kasich with his family during his tenure in Congress

Kasich has been married twice. His first marriage was to Mary Lee Griffith from 1975 to 1980, and they had no children. Griffith has campaigned for Kasich since their divorce. Kasich and his current wife, Karen Waldbillig, a former public relations executive, were married in March 1997 and have twin daughters, Emma and Reese.

Kasich was raised a Catholic, but considers denominations irrelevant, while stating that "there's always going to be a part of me that considers myself a Catholic." He drifted away from his religion as an adult, but came to embrace an Anglican faith after his parents were killed in a car crash by a drunk driver on August 20, 1987. He joined the Episcopal Church as an adult. Kasich has said he "doesn't find God in church" but does belong to St. Augustine's in Westerville, Ohio, which is part of the Anglican Church in North America, a conservative church with which he remained when it broke off from the Episcopal Church.

== Legacy ==
Cardinal Hall at the Ohio Expo Center and State Fairgrounds in Columbus, Ohio, was renamed Kasich Hall in 2019 in honor of Kasich.

== Electoral history ==
Election results
Year	Office	Election	Candidate	Party	Votes	%	Opponent	Party	Votes	%	Opponent	Party	Votes	%
1982	U.S. House of Representatives	General	John Kasich	Republican	88,335	50%	Bob Shamansky	Democratic	82,753	47%	Russell A. Lewis	Libertarian	3,939	2%
1984	U.S. House of Representatives	General	John Kasich	Republican	148,899	70%	Richard S. Sloan	Democratic	65,215	30%				
1986	U.S. House of Representatives	General	John Kasich	Republican	117,905	73%	Timothy C. Jochim	Democratic	42,727	27%				
1988	U.S. House of Representatives	General	John Kasich	Republican	204,892	80%	Mark P. Brown	Democratic	50,782	20%				
1990	U.S. House of Representatives	General	John Kasich	Republican	130,495	72%	Mike Gelpi	Democratic	50,784	28%				
1992	U.S. House of Representatives	General	John Kasich	Republican	170,297	71%	Bob Fitrakis	Democratic	68,761	29%				
1994	U.S. House of Representatives	General	John Kasich	Republican	114,608	67%	Cynthia L. Ruccia	Democratic	57,294	33%	N/A	Write-in	443	0%
1996	U.S. House of Representatives	General	John Kasich	Republican	151,667	64%	Cynthia L. Ruccia	Democratic	78,762	33%	Barbara Ann Edelman	Natural Law	7,005	3%
1998	U.S. House of Representatives	General	John Kasich	Republican	124,197	67%	Edward S. Brown	Democratic	60,694	33%				
2010	Governor of Ohio	General	John Kasich	Republican	1,889,186	49%	Ted Strickland Incumbent	Democratic	1,812,059	47%	Ken Matesz	Libertarian	92,116	2%
2014	Governor of Ohio	General	John Kasich	Republican	1,944,848	64%	Ed FitzGerald	Democratic	1,009,359	33%	Anita Rios	Green	101,706	3%

== Published works ==
Kasich has authored five books:

- Courage is Contagious, published in 1998, made the New York Times bestseller list
- Stand for Something: The Battle for America's Soul, published in 2006
- Every Other Monday, published in 2010. This book is a New York Times bestseller.
- Two Paths: America Divided or United, published in 2017
- It's Up to Us: Ten Little Ways We Can Bring About Big Change, published in 2019

== See also ==
- Ohio's 12th congressional district
- List of United States representatives from Ohio
- 2010 Ohio gubernatorial election
- 2014 Ohio gubernatorial election
- 2016 Republican Party presidential candidates
- List of John Kasich 2016 presidential campaign endorsements

U.S. House of Representatives
Preceded by Bob Shamansky	Member of the U.S. House of Representatives from Ohio's 12th congressional district 1983–2001	Succeeded by Pat Tiberi
Preceded by Bill Gradison	Ranking Member of the House Budget Committee; 1993–1995	Succeeded by Martin Olav Sabo
Preceded by Martin Olav Sabo	Chair of the House Budget Committee; 1995–2001	Succeeded by Jim Nussle
Party political offices
Preceded by Ken Blackwell	Republican nominee for Governor of Ohio; 2010, 2014	Succeeded by Mike DeWine
Political offices
Preceded by Ted Strickland	Governor of Ohio; 2011–2019	Succeeded by Mike DeWine
U.S. order of precedence (ceremonial)
Preceded by Ted Strickland as Former Governor	Order of precedence of the United States; Within Ohio	Succeeded by Jack Markell as Former Governor
Preceded by Ted Strickland as Former Governor	Order of precedence of the United States; Outside Ohio	Succeeded by Bobby Jindal as Former Governor
