= 2010 Ohio gubernatorial election =

- November 2, 2010
- Turnout: 49.22% (registered voters) ▼4.03pp
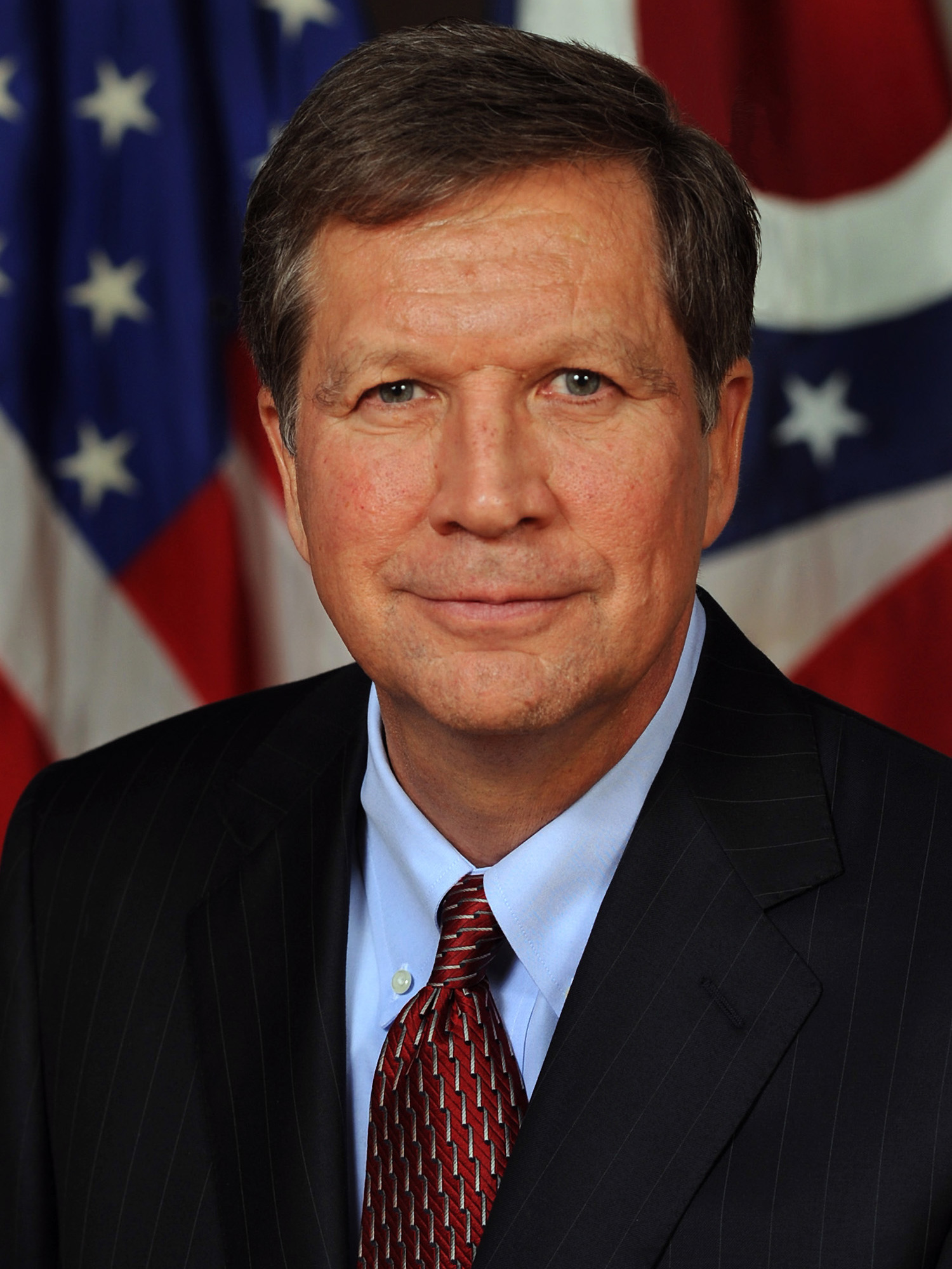

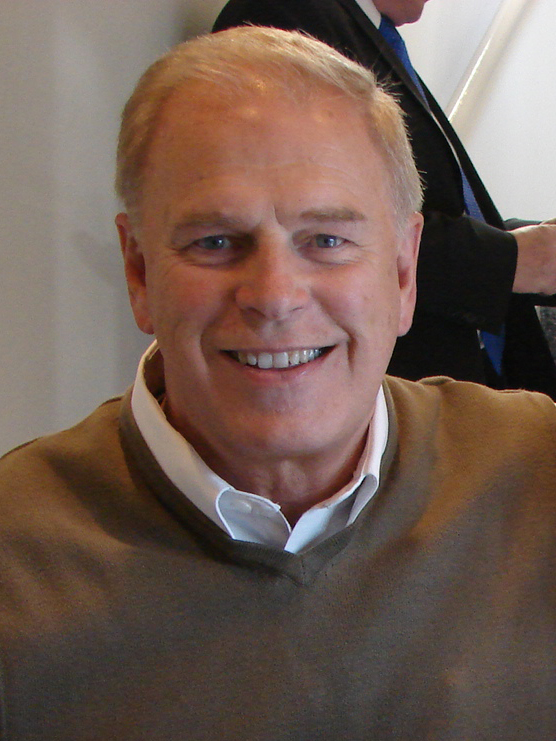
Nominee	John Kasich	Ted Strickland
Party	Republican	Democratic
Running mate	Mary Taylor	Yvette Brown
Popular vote	1,889,186	1,812,059
Percentage	49.04%	47.04%
- Kasich: 40–50% 50–60% 60–70% Strickland: 40–50% 50–60% 60–70% 70–80%
Governor before election
Ted Strickland
Democratic
Elected Governor
John Kasich
Republican

The 2010 Ohio gubernatorial election took place on November 2, 2010. Incumbent Democratic Governor Ted Strickland ran for a second term and was opposed by former U.S. Representative John Kasich; both Strickland and Kasich won their respective primaries uncontested. Ultimately, Kasich defeated Strickland by a 2% margin.

Strickland's defeat was widely attributed to the decline of Ohio's economy, as well as the loss of 400,000 jobs since the beginning of his term. The policies of the then-president Barack Obama proved to be a hot topic among voters, with Strickland voicing his support for the healthcare overhauls initiated by Obama's administration, contrary to Kasich, who opposed the policies. Republicans held Ohio's governorship from this election until Democratic nominee Amy Acton won 16 years later in 2026.

== Democratic primary ==
=== Candidates ===
- Ted Strickland, incumbent governor of Ohio

=== Results ===
Democratic primary results
Party	Candidate	Votes	%
Democratic	Ted Strickland (incumbent)	630,785	100.00%
Total votes		630,785	100.00%

== Republican primary ==
=== Candidates ===
- John Kasich, former U.S. representative, chairman of the House Budget Committee and candidate for president in 2000

=== Results ===
Republican primary results
Party	Candidate	Votes	%
Republican	John Kasich	746,719	100.00%
Total votes		746,719	100.00%

== Libertarian primary ==
=== Candidates ===
- Ken Matesz

=== Results ===
Libertarian Party primary results
Party	Candidate	Votes	%
Libertarian	Ken Matesz	4,407	100.00%
Total votes		4,407	100.00%

== Green primary ==
=== Candidates ===
- Dennis Spisak, former congressional candidate

=== Results ===
Green Party primary results
Party	Candidate	Votes	%
Green	Dennis Spisak	924	100.00%
Total votes		924	100.00%

== General election ==
=== Predictions ===
Source	Ranking	As of
Cook Political Report	Tossup	October 14, 2010
Rothenberg	Tilt R (flip)	October 28, 2010
RealClearPolitics	Tossup	November 1, 2010
Sabato's Crystal Ball	Lean R (flip)	October 28, 2010
CQ Politics	Tossup	October 28, 2010

=== Polling ===
Poll source	Date(s) administered	Ted Strickland (D)	John Kasich (R)
Public Policy Polling	October 28–30, 2010	48%	49%
Angus Reid Public Opinion	October 27–29, 2010	46%	49%
Survey USA	October 22–26, 2010	44%	49%
Quinnipiac University	October 18–24, 2010	43%	49%
Fox News/POR	October 23, 2010	43%	47%
CNN/Time Magazine	October 15–19, 2010	48%	46%
University of Cincinnati	October 14–18, 2010	47%	49%
Quinnipiac University	October 12–17, 2010	41%	51%
University of Cincinnati	October 8–13, 2010	43%	51%
Rasmussen Reports	October 11, 2010	45%	48%
Fox News/POR	October 9, 2010	42%	47%
Angus Reid Public Opinion	October 5–8, 2010	46%	48%
Quinnipiac University	September 29 – October 3, 2010	41%	50%
Fox News/POR	October 2, 2010	43%	49%
Rasmussen Reports	September 27, 2010	42%	50%
CBS/NY Times	September 23–27, 2010	42%	43%
Reuters/Ipsos	September 23–25, 2010	46%	47%
Ohio Newspapers Poll/UC	September 24, 2010	45%	49%
SurveyUSA	September 14, 2010	40%	52%
CNN/Time Magazine	September 10–14, 2010	44%	51%
Quinnipiac	September 9–14, 2010	37%	54%
Rasmussen Reports	September 13, 2010	43%	50%
Fox News/Pulse Research	September 11, 2010	43%	48%
The Columbus Dispatch	August 25 – September 3, 2010	37%	49%
Rasmussen Reports	August 30, 2010	39%	47%
Public Policy Polling	August 27–29, 2010	40%	50%
Rasmussen Reports	August 16, 2010	40%	48%
Reuters/Ipsos	August 6–8, 2010	39%	48%
Rasmussen Reports	August 2, 2010	42%	45%
Rasmussen Reports	July 19, 2010	43%	48%
Rasmussen Reports	June 29, 2010	40%	47%
Public Policy Polling	June 26–27, 2010	41%	43%
Quinnipiac	June 22–27, 2010	43%	38%
Rasmussen Reports	June 3, 2010	42%	47%
UC/The Ohio Poll	May 11–20, 2010	49%	44%
Rasmussen Reports	May 5, 2010	45%	46%
Quinnipiac	April 21–26, 2010	44%	38%
Research 2000	April 5–7, 2010	45%	40%
Rasmussen Reports	March 30, 2010	45%	46%
Quinnipiac	March 23–29, 2010	43%	38%
Public Policy Polling	March 20–21, 2010	37%	42%
Rasmussen Reports	March 4, 2010	38%	49%
Quinnipiac	February 16–21, 2010	44%	39%
Rasmussen Reports	February 5–6, 2010	41%	47%
The Ohio Newspaper	January 13–19, 2010	45%	51%
Ohio Right to Life	January 8–12, 2010	33%	43%
Rasmussen Reports	January 12, 2010	40%	47%
Rasmussen Reports	December 7, 2009	39%	48%
Quinnipiac	November 5–9, 2009	40%	40%
The Ohio Newspaper	October 14–20, 2009	48%	47%
Rasmussen Reports	September 23, 2009	45%	46%
Quinnipiac	September 10–13, 2009	46%	36%
Research 2000	July 8, 2009	44%	39%
Quinnipiac	June 26 – July 1, 2009	43%	38%
Public Policy Polling	June 17–19, 2009	44%	42%
Quinnipiac	April 28 – May 4, 2009	51%	32%
Quinnipiac	March 10–15, 2009	51%	31%
Quinnipiac	January 29 – February 2, 2009	56%	26%
Public Policy Polling	January 17–18, 2009	45%	39%

=== Results ===
When the polls closed on election night, the race was very close, with Strickland and Kasich neck and neck. As the night wore on, Kasich's lead began to pick up strength. However, once Cuyahoga County came in, Kasich's lead began to erode. In the end Kasich still won, but it was one of the closest gubernatorial elections in Ohio history. Strickland conceded at around 2 A.M. EST.

2010 Ohio gubernatorial election
Party	Candidate	Votes	%	±%
Republican	John Kasich	1,889,186	49.04%	+12.39%
Democratic	Ted Strickland (incumbent)	1,812,059	47.04%	−13.50%
Libertarian	Ken Matesz	92,116	2.39%	+0.61%
Green	Dennis Spisak	58,475	1.52%	+0.50%
Write-in		633	0.02%	N/A
Majority		77,127	2.00%	−21.89%
Total votes		3,852,469	100.00%	
Republican gain from Democratic				

==== By county ====
County	John Kasich Republican		Ted Strickland Democratic		Various candidates Other parties		Margin		Total votes cast
County	#	%	#	%	#	%	#	%	Total votes cast
Adams	4,837	57.96%	3,191	38.23%	318	3.81%	1,646	19.73%	8,346
Allen	18,982	57.57%	12,755	38.69%	1,233	3.74%	6,227	18.88%	32,970
Ashland	10,586	60.89%	5,897	33.92%	902	5.19%	4,689	26.97%	17,385
Ashtabula	12,582	42.30%	15,128	50.85%	2,038	6.85%	-2,546	-8.55%	29,748
Athens	4,525	26.42%	12,073	70.48%	531	3.10%	-7,548	-44.06%	17,129
Auglaize	10,873	65.79%	4,788	28.97%	866	5.24%	6,085	36.82%	16,527
Belmont	10,411	43.96%	12,467	52.64%	805	3.40%	-2,056	-8.68%	23,683
Brown	7,803	58.60%	4,894	36.76%	618	4.64%	2,909	21.84%	13,315
Butler	74,942	62.69%	40,153	33.59%	4,444	3.72%	34,789	29.10%	119,539
Carroll	5,002	50.19%	4,272	42.87%	692	6.94%	730	7.32%	9,966
Champaign	7,688	56.89%	5,137	38.01%	689	5.10%	2,551	18.88%	13,514
Clark	22,135	48.14%	21,660	47.11%	2,181	4.75%	475	1.03%	45,976
Clermont	42,763	67.80%	17,490	27.73%	2,817	4.47%	25,273	40.07%	63,070
Clinton	7,621	62.86%	3,836	31.64%	666	5.50%	3,785	31.22%	12,123
Columbiana	16,021	48.39%	15,553	46.98%	1,535	4.63%	468	1.41%	33,109
Coshocton	6,234	51.22%	5,179	42.56%	757	6.22%	1,055	8.66%	12,170
Crawford	7,901	56.10%	5,334	37.87%	850	6.03%	2,567	18.23%	14,085
Cuyahoga	148,611	35.83%	251,251	60.57%	14,923	3.60%	-102,640	-24.74%	414,785
Darke	11,975	63.15%	5,957	31.42%	1,030	5.43%	6,018	31.73%	18,962
Defiance	6,677	51.69%	5,561	43.05%	680	5.26%	1,116	8.64%	12,918
Delaware	45,285	65.83%	21,988	31.96%	1,519	2.21%	23,297	33.87%	68,792
Erie	13,096	45.88%	14,171	49.64%	1,280	4.48%	-1,075	-3.76%	28,547
Fairfield	29,744	59.06%	18,795	37.32%	1,822	3.62%	10,949	21.74%	50,361
Fayette	4,614	59.77%	2,827	36.62%	278	3.61%	1,787	23.15%	7,719
Franklin	169,487	44.12%	203,862	53.07%	10,773	2.81%	-34,375	-8.95%	384,122
Fulton	7,798	53.41%	6,131	42.00%	670	4.59%	1,667	11.41%	14,599
Gallia	4,809	50.13%	4,553	47.46%	231	2.41%	256	2.67%	9,593
Geauga	22,312	60.30%	13,148	35.54%	1,540	4.16%	9,164	24.76%	37,000
Greene	34,564	59.16%	21,561	36.90%	2,303	3.94%	13,003	22.26%	58,428
Guernsey	5,900	48.56%	5,594	46.04%	656	5.40%	306	2.52%	12,150
Hamilton	143,222	50.42%	132,087	46.50%	8,745	3.08%	11,135	3.92%	284,054
Hancock	15,063	61.30%	8,450	34.39%	1,061	4.31%	6,613	26.91%	24,574
Hardin	4,904	54.62%	3,502	39.00%	573	6.38%	1,402	15.62%	8,979
Harrison	2,548	44.92%	2,840	50.07%	284	5.01%	-292	-5.15%	5,672
Henry	5,529	55.61%	3,922	39.45%	491	4.94%	1,607	16.16%	9,942
Highland	7,455	60.65%	4,215	34.29%	621	5.06%	3,240	26.36%	12,291
Hocking	4,184	46.27%	4,441	49.11%	418	4.62%	-257	-2.84%	9,043
Holmes	5,967	68.98%	2,212	25.57%	471	5.45%	3,755	43.41%	8,650
Huron	9,051	54.62%	6,547	39.51%	974	5.87%	2,504	15.11%	16,572
Jackson	4,592	45.34%	5,227	51.60%	310	3.06%	-635	-6.26%	10,129
Jefferson	10,957	44.30%	12,819	51.83%	957	3.87%	-1,862	-7.53%	24,733
Knox	12,371	60.42%	7,044	34.40%	1,060	5.18%	5,327	26.02%	20,475
Lake	41,467	52.35%	34,157	43.12%	3,581	4.53%	7,310	9.23%	79,205
Lawrence	8,374	47.20%	8,956	50.48%	410	2.32%	-582	-3.28%	17,740
Licking	35,073	58.98%	21,892	36.81%	2,505	4.21%	13,181	22.17%	59,470
Logan	9,292	63.96%	4,420	30.42%	816	5.62%	4,872	33.54%	14,528
Lorain	43,994	44.24%	50,714	51.00%	4,725	4.76%	-6,720	-6.76%	99,433
Lucas	52,070	35.98%	88,210	60.95%	4,456	3.07%	-36,140	-24.97%	144,736
Madison	7,623	60.16%	4,545	35.87%	504	3.97%	3,078	24.29%	12,672
Mahoning	26,566	31.07%	56,228	65.76%	2,712	3.17%	-29,662	-34.69%	85,506
Marion	10,535	52.47%	8,517	42.42%	1,025	5.11%	2,018	10.05%	20,077
Medina	36,407	57.77%	23,761	37.71%	2,848	4.52%	12,646	20.06%	63,016
Meigs	3,322	47.78%	3,430	49.34%	200	2.88%	-108	-1.56%	6,952
Mercer	10,852	68.00%	4,396	27.55%	710	4.45%	6,456	40.45%	15,958
Miami	23,543	63.39%	11,729	31.58%	1,865	5.03%	11,814	31.81%	37,137
Monroe	2,102	39.55%	3,063	57.63%	150	2.82%	-961	-18.08%	5,315
Montgomery	89,218	48.21%	89,379	48.30%	6,459	3.49%	-161	-0.09%	185,056
Morgan	2,371	49.25%	2,244	46.61%	199	4.14%	127	2.64%	4,814
Morrow	7,078	60.25%	3,989	33.95%	681	5.80%	3,089	26.30%	11,748
Muskingum	13,506	51.78%	11,202	42.95%	1,374	5.27%	2,304	8.83%	26,082
Noble	2,351	44.86%	2,609	49.78%	281	5.36%	-258	-4.92%	5,241
Ottawa	7,350	46.26%	7,945	50.00%	595	3.74%	-595	-3.74%	15,890
Paulding	3,695	53.73%	2,795	40.64%	387	5.63%	900	13.09%	6,877
Perry	4,913	48.41%	4,741	46.71%	495	4.88%	172	1.70%	10,149
Pickaway	9,789	57.42%	6,639	38.94%	621	3.64%	3,150	18.48%	17,049
Pike	3,549	40.44%	4,940	56.30%	286	3.26%	-1,391	-15.86%	8,775
Portage	24,341	48.78%	23,161	46.42%	2,395	4.80%	1,180	2.36%	49,897
Preble	8,817	58.91%	5,217	34.86%	933	6.23%	3,600	24.05%	14,967
Putnam	8,210	62.07%	4,446	33.62%	570	4.31%	3,764	28.45%	13,226
Richland	22,691	55.00%	16,470	39.92%	2,096	5.08%	6,221	15.08%	41,257
Ross	10,246	46.48%	10,949	49.67%	849	3.85%	-703	-3.19%	22,044
Sandusky	9,326	47.39%	9,261	47.06%	1,091	5.55%	65	0.33%	19,678
Scioto	8,998	37.93%	14,244	60.04%	481	2.03%	-5,246	-22.11%	23,723
Seneca	8,716	49.35%	7,790	44.11%	1,155	6.54%	926	5.24%	17,661
Shelby	11,402	64.06%	5,355	30.09%	1,041	5.85%	6,047	33.97%	17,798
Stark	63,779	49.72%	58,492	45.60%	5,996	4.68%	5,287	4.12%	128,267
Summit	79,963	44.40%	93,740	52.05%	6,406	3.55%	-13,777	-7.65%	180,109
Trumbull	24,811	33.97%	44,935	61.52%	3,297	4.51%	-20,124	-27.55%	73,043
Tuscarawas	14,214	48.94%	13,182	45.39%	1,647	5.67%	1,032	3.55%	29,043
Union	11,739	66.30%	5,304	29.95%	664	3.75%	6,435	36.35%	17,707
Van Wert	6,396	64.63%	3,014	30.45%	487	4.92%	3,382	34.18%	9,897
Vinton	1,764	41.06%	2,351	54.73%	181	4.21%	-587	-13.67%	4,296
Warren	54,536	68.37%	22,271	27.92%	2,955	3.71%	32,265	40.45%	79,762
Washington	10,230	48.20%	10,408	49.04%	585	2.76%	-178	-0.84%	21,223
Wayne	21,243	58.12%	13,490	36.91%	1,818	4.97%	7,753	21.21%	36,551
Williams	6,610	54.23%	4,931	40.46%	647	5.31%	1,679	13.77%	12,188
Wood	20,390	46.61%	21,369	48.85%	1,987	4.54%	-979	-2.24%	43,746
Wyandot	4,103	56.87%	2,666	36.95%	446	6.18%	1,437	19.92%	7,215
Totals	1,889,186	49.04%	1,812,059	47.04%	151,224	3.92%	77,127	2.00%	3,852,469

Counties that flipped from Democratic to Republican

- Adams (largest city: West Union)
- Ashland (largest city: Ashland)
- Allen (largest city: Lima)
- Brown (largest city: Georgetown)
- Carroll (largest city: Carrollton)
- Champaign (largest city: Urbana)
- Clark (largest municipality: Springfield)
- Clinton (largest city: Wilmington)
- Columbiana (largest city: Salem)
- Coshocton (largest city: Coshocton)
- Crawford (largest city: Bucyrus)
- Delaware (largest city: Delaware)
- Defiance (largest city: Defiance)
- Fairfield (largest city: Lancaster)
- Fayette (largest city: Washington Court House)
- Fulton (largest city: Wauseon)
- Gallia (largest city: Gallipolis)
- Geauga (largest city: Chardon)
- Guernsey (largest city: Cambridge)
- Hardin (largest city: Kenton)
- Henry (largest city: Napoleon)
- Highland (largest city: Hillsboro)
- Huron (largest city: Norwalk)
- Knox (largest city: Mount Vernon)
- Lake (largest city: Mentor)
- Licking (largest city: Newark)
- Madison (largest city: London)
- Marion (largest city: Marion)
- Medina (largest city: Medina)
- Morgan (largest city: McConnelsville)
- Morrow (largest city: Mount Gilead)
- Muskingum (largest city: Zanesville)
- Paulding (largest city: Paulding)
- Perry (largest city: New Lexington)
- Pickaway (largest city: Circleville)
- Portage (largest city: Kent)
- Preble (largest city: Eaton)
- Richland (largest city: Mansfield)
- Sandusky (largest city: Fremont)
- Seneca (largest city: Tiffin)
- Stark (largest city: Canton)
- Tuscarawas (largest city: New Philadelphia)
- Wayne (largest city: Wooster)
- Williams (largest city: Bryan)
- Wyandot (largest city: Upper Sandusky)
