= 2022 Cuyahoga County Executive election =

- November 8, 2022
- Turnout: 47.4% ▼7.1 pp
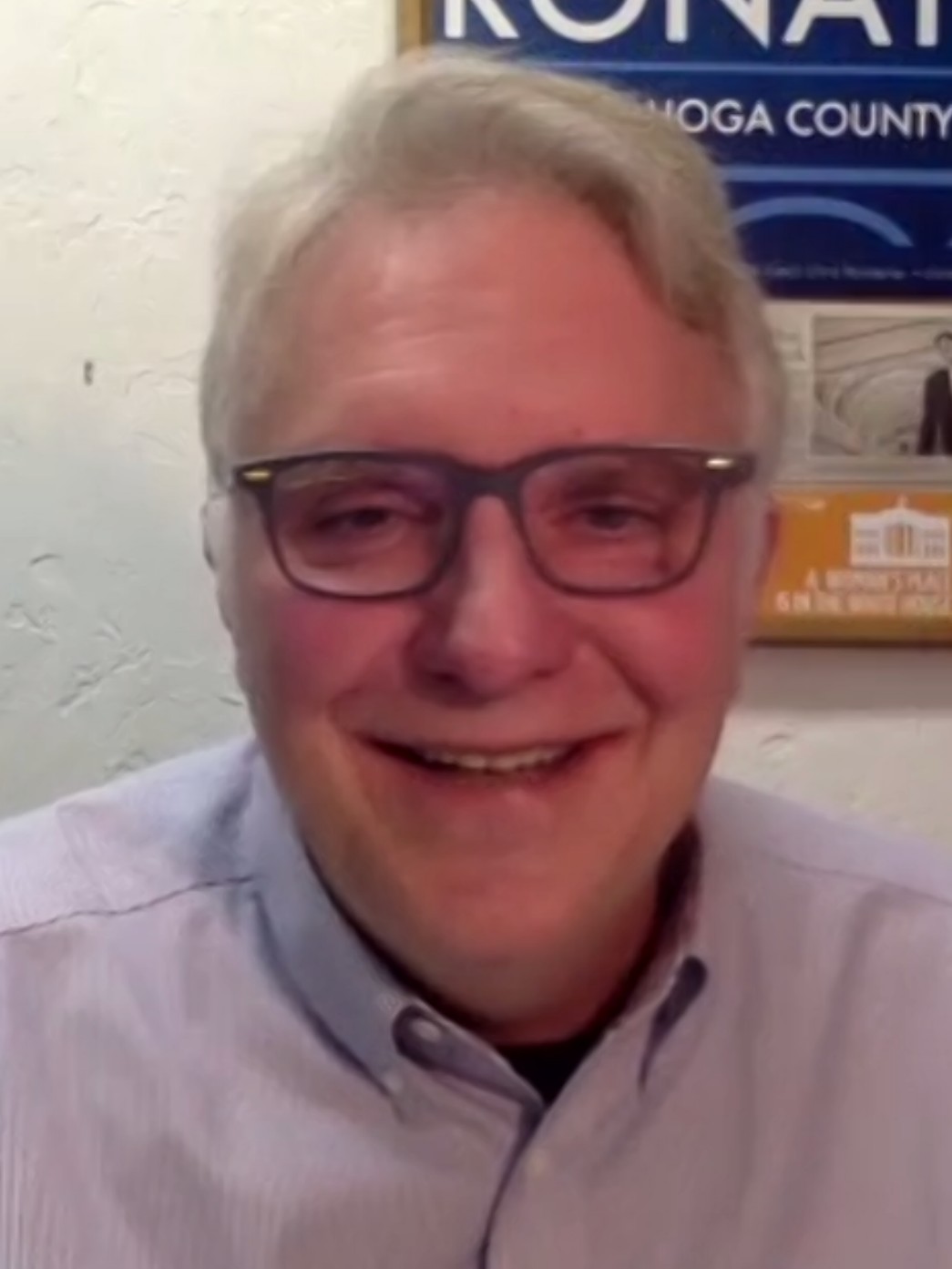

| Candidate | Chris Ronayne | Lee Weingart |
| Party | Democratic | Republican |
| Popular vote | 247,301 | 138,979 |
| Percentage | 63.9% | 35.9% |
- Results by municipality Ronayne: 50–60% 60–70% 70–80% 80–90% >90% Weingart: 50–60% 60–70%
County Executive before election
Armond Budish
Democratic
Elected County Executive
Chris Ronayne
Democratic

The 2022 Cuyahoga County Executive election took place on November 8, 2022, to elect the County Executive of Cuyahoga County, Ohio. Incumbent Democratic County Executive Armond Budish was eligible to run for a third term, but instead chose to retire.

In the primary, the Democrats nominated former president of University Circle Inc. Chris Ronayne, while the Republicans nominated former Cuyahoga County commissioner Lee Weingart.

Ronayne defeated Weingart in the general election.

== Background ==
Although incumbent County Executive Armond Budish had easily won reelection by an unprecedented 35 points in 2018 with no serious opposition in the Democratic primary or the general election, various scandals in Budish's second term raised questions about his leadership of the county.

Shortly after Budish's reelection in late November 2018, the United States Marshals Service released a report on the Cuyahoga County Jail, which found that conditions at the jail were inhumane and violated the Constitutional Rights of detainees. Budish received scrutiny for his plans to make the prison a source of revenue for the county, a plan which critics allege led to overcrowding and understaffing.

From June 2018 to December 2020, 13 inmates died at the County Jail, with 8 dying in 2018 alone. In October 2021, Ken Mills, the former director of the jail, was sentenced to nine months in county jail for misdemeanor dereliction of duty and falsification (in November 2022, the charges were overturned by the 8th District Court of Appeals of Ohio due to an unfair trail). The next month the County agreed to a settlement with Gary Brack, a nursing supervisor for the Jail who was fired for criticizing understaffing and accusing Mills of blocking the hiring of additional nurses in a testimony before Cuyahoga County Council. According to The Plain Dealer, Budish pressured the CEO of MetroHealth into firing Brack.

In February 2019, the County Executive's offices were searched by Federal Bureau of Investigation and Ohio Bureau of Criminal Investigation agents as part of an inquiry into corruption in the county. Items seized in the search included Budish's computer and cellphone.

Although Budish has never been indicted for any wrongdoing as County Executive, the mismanagement of the County Jail and other scandals severely weakened his standing. In November 2021, Budish announced that he would not run for reelection to a third term, citing family issues.

== Democratic primary ==
Chris Ronayne became the first Democratic candidate to enter the race in August 2021 when he announced that he would step down as president of University Circle Inc. to pursue the office, after informally announcing his bid in July.

In December 2021, one month after incumbent Armond Budish announced that he would not run for reelection, Maple Heights mayor Annette Blackwell entered the race after prematurely launching her campaign website. A month later in January 2022, Blackwell suspended her campaign, citing her commitment to Maple Heights.

Just two days after Blackwell dropped out, on January 5 Warrensville Heights mayor Brad Sellers launched his campaign. Soon after, The Plain Dealer reported that Sellers had approved a 15-year, 100% tax abatement on his own house in 2018, and that he had lied about being debt-free on the application despite being delinquent on his taxes. Days later on January 15, Sellers dropped out, stating that the reporting had become a distraction from the issues of the race.

On January 13, former Ohio State Senator Shirley Smith, who had run for the office unsuccessfully in 2014, announced her candidacy. This candidacy lasted until February, when she dropped out to endorse Ronayne.

With Smith's withdrawal from the race, Ronayne faced Tariq Shabazz in the primary election and won with 66% of the vote.

=== Candidates ===
==== Nominee ====
- Chris Ronayne, former president of University Circle Inc. (2005–2021)

==== Eliminated in primary ====
- Tariq Shabazz, U.S. Navy veteran, candidate for United States Representative in 2020 and 2021

==== Withdrew ====
- Annette Blackwell, mayor of Maple Heights (2017–present)
- Brad Sellers, mayor of Warrensville Heights (2012–present)
- Shirley Smith, former Ohio State Senator from District 21 (2007–2014), candidate for County Executive in 2014 and for United States Representative in 2021 (endorsed Ronayne)

==== Declined ====
- Armond Budish, incumbent County Executive of Cuyahoga County, Ohio (2015–present)
- Kevin J. Kelley, former president of Cleveland City Council (2014–2022), candidate for Mayor of Cleveland in 2021

=== Primary results ===
Democratic primary results
| Party | Candidate | Votes | % |
|---|---|---|---|
| Democratic | Chris Ronayne | 51,027 | 65.68% |
| Democratic | Tariq K. Shabazz | 26,668 | 34.32% |
| Total votes | | 77,695 | 100.0% |

== Republican primary ==
Lee Weingart, a former County commissioner and corporate lobbyist, launched his campaign for County Executive in February 2021.

=== Candidates ===
==== Nominee ====
- Lee Weingart, lobbyist and former Cuyahoga County commissioner (1995–1997)

=== Primary results ===
Republican primary results
| Party | Candidate | Votes | % |
|---|---|---|---|
| Republican | Lee Weingart | 37,633 | 100.0% |
| Total votes | | 37,633 | 100.0% |

== General election ==
The general election was held on November 8, 2022.

=== Results ===
2022 Cuyahoga County executive election
| Party | Candidate | Votes | % |
|---|---|---|---|
| Democratic | Chris Ronayne | 247,301 | 63.9% |
| Republican | Lee Weingart | 138,979 | 35.9% |
| Write-in | | 288 | 0.1% |
| Total votes | | 386,568 | 100.0% |
