= 2014 Cuyahoga County Executive election =

- November 4, 2014
- Turnout: 39.6% ▼4.6 pp
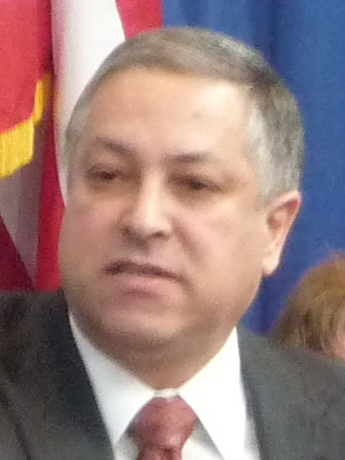

Candidate	Armond Budish	Jack Schron
Party	Democratic	Republican
Popular vote	196,539	133,646
Percentage	59.5%	40.5%
- Results by municipality Budish: 40–50% 50–60% 60–70% 70–80% 80–90% >90% Schron: 40–50% 50–60% 60–70% 70–80% >90%
County Executive before election
Ed FitzGerald
Democratic
Elected County Executive
Armond Budish
Democratic

The 2014 Cuyahoga County Executive election took place on November 4, 2014, to elect the County Executive of Cuyahoga County, Ohio. Incumbent Democratic County Executive Ed FitzGerald was eligible to run for reelection, but instead retired in order to run unsuccessfully for governor in the concurrent gubernatorial election.

The Democrats nominated former Speaker of the Ohio House of Representatives Armond Budish, while the Republicans nominated Cuyahoga County Councilman Jack Schron.

Budish defeated Schron 59.52% to 40.48%, and took office on January 1, 2015.

== Democratic primary ==
=== Candidates ===
==== Nominee ====
- Armond Budish, former Speaker of the Ohio House of Representatives (2009-2011), Ohio State Representative from District 8 (2007-2014)

==== Eliminated in primary ====
- Thomas O'Grady, former mayor of North Olmsted (2005-2009)
- Bob Reid, former Cuyahoga County Sheriff (2009-2013)
- Walter Allen Rogers Jr., professional artist
- Timothy J. Russo, blogger
- Shirley Smith, Ohio State Senator from District 21 (2007-2014)

==== Declined ====
- Ed FitzGerald, incumbent County Executive (2011-2014) (ran for governor)
- Jim Rokakis, former Cuyahoga County Treasurer (1997-2013)
- Chris Ronayne, president of University Circle Inc. (2005-2021)
- Brad Sellers, mayor of Warrensville Heights (2012-present)

=== Primary results ===
Democratic primary results
Party	Candidate	Votes	%
Democratic	Armond Budish	56,642	56.20%
Democratic	Shirley Smith	20,632	20.47%
Democratic	Timothy J. Russo	9,317	9.24%
Democratic	Bob Reid	7,017	6.96%
Democratic	Thomas O'Grady	5,606	5.56%
Democratic	Walter Allen Rogers Jr.	1,580	1.57%
Total votes		100,794	100.0%

== Republican primary ==
=== Candidates ===
==== Nominee ====
- Jack Schron, Cuyahoga County Councilman from District 6

==== Disqualified ====
- Tanner Fischbach

==== Declined ====
- Tom Patton, Ohio State Senator from District 24 (2008-2016)

=== Primary results ===
Republican primary results
Party	Candidate	Votes	%
Republican	Jack Schron	29,155	100.0%
Total votes		29,155	100.0%

== General election ==
=== Results ===
2014 Cuyahoga County executive election
Party	Candidate	Votes	%
Democratic	Armond Budish	196,539	59.52%
Republican	Jack Schron	133,646	40.48%
Total votes		330,185	100.0%
Democratic hold			
