= 2018 Cuyahoga County Executive election =

- November 6, 2018
- Turnout: 54.5% ▲14.9 pp
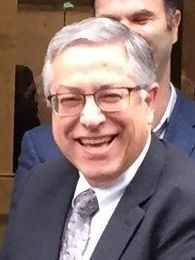

| Candidate | Armond Budish | Peter J. Corrigan |
| Party | Democratic | Republican |
| Popular vote | 318,612 | 153,630 |
| Percentage | 67.5% | 32.5% |
- Results by municipality Budish: 40–50% 50–60% 60–70% 70–80% 80–90% >90% Corrigan: 40–50% 50–60% 60–70%
County Executive before election
Armond Budish
Democratic
Elected County Executive
Armond Budish
Democratic

The 2018 Cuyahoga County Executive election took place on November 6, 2018, to elect the County Executive of Cuyahoga County, Ohio. Incumbent Democratic County Executive Armond Budish won reelection to a second term with 67.47% of the vote, making him the first since the establishment of the office to be reelected.

== Democratic primary ==
Incumbent Armond Budish ran unopposed not only in the Democratic primary, but in the Republican primary as well, as no other candidates filed petitions to challenge him.

=== Candidates ===
==== Nominee ====
- Armond Budish, incumbent County Executive of Cuyahoga County, Ohio

=== Primary results ===
Democratic primary results
| Party | Candidate | Votes | % |
|---|---|---|---|
| Democratic | Armond Budish (incumbent) | 84,785 | 100.0% |
| Total votes | | 84,785 | 100.0% |

== Republican primary ==
No Republican filed a petition with the Cuyahoga County Board of Elections to get on the primary ballot. Peter J. Corrigan ran a successful write-in campaign to become the party's nominee in the general election.

=== Candidates ===
==== Nominee ====
- Peter J. Corrigan, chief operating officer of Prestolite Electric, Republican nominee for Ohio's 10th congressional district in 2010

==== Withdrew ====
- Tanner Fischbach, candidate for county executive in 2014 (did not file for the primary ballot)

=== Primary results ===
Republican primary results
| Party | Candidate | Votes | % |
|---|---|---|---|
| | Write-in | 4,878 | 100.0% |
| Total votes | | 4,878 | 100.0% |

== General election ==
=== Results ===
2018 Cuyahoga County executive election
| Party | Candidate | Votes | % |
|---|---|---|---|
| Democratic | Armond Budish (incumbent) | 318,612 | 67.47% |
| Republican | Peter J. Corrigan | 153,630 | 32.53% |
| Total votes | | 492,323 | 100.0% |
| Democratic hold | | | |

==== Results by municipality ====
Results by municipality
| Municipality | Budish | | Corrigan | | Total votes |
| Municipality | Votes | % | Votes | % | Total votes |
|---|---|---|---|---|---|
| Bay Village | 4,317 | 50.50% | 3,884 | 45.44% | 8,548 |
| Beachwood | 5,132 | 76.99% | 1,309 | 19.64% | 6,666 |
| Bedford | 3,714 | 74.13% | 1,139 | 22.73% | 5,010 |
| Bedford Heights | 4,007 | 88.30% | 395 | 8.70% | 4,538 |
| Bentleyville | 208 | 40.00% | 298 | 57.31% | 520 |
| Berea | 4,355 | 58.46% | 2,816 | 37.80% | 7,450 |
| Bratenahl | 545 | 61.72% | 304 | 34.43% | 883 |
| Brecksville | 3,176 | 42.75% | 3,980 | 53.57% | 7,430 |
| Broadview Heights | 3,885 | 42.92% | 4,733 | 52.29% | 9,051 |
| Brook Park | 3,427 | 51.91% | 2,852 | 43.20% | 6,602 |
| Brooklyn | 2,179 | 54.18% | 1,593 | 39.61% | 4,022 |
| Brooklyn Heights | 342 | 46.15% | 361 | 48.72% | 741 |
| Chagrin Falls | 1,138 | 50.42% | 1,033 | 45.76% | 2,257 |
| Chagrin Falls Township | 28 | 37.33% | 45 | 60.00% | 75 |
| Cleveland | 86,003 | 78.66% | 18,831 | 17.22% | 109,330 |
| Cleveland Heights | 17,772 | 83.63% | 2,870 | 13.54% | 21,192 |
| Cuyahoga Heights | 88 | 35.77% | 140 | 56.91% | 246 |
| East Cleveland | 4,303 | 91.07% | 231 | 4.89% | 4,725 |
| Euclid | 14,174 | 76.97% | 3,550 | 19.28% | 18,415 |
| Fairview Park | 4,425 | 53.60% | 3,446 | 41.74% | 8,256 |
| Garfield Heights | 6,945 | 73.88% | 2,151 | 22.88% | 9,400 |
| Gates Mills | 605 | 43.37% | 757 | 54.27% | 1,395 |
| Glenwillow | 252 | 70.55% | 86 | 25.07% | 343 |
| Highland Heights | 2,089 | 46.45% | 2,256 | 50.17% | 4,497 |
| Highland Hills | 281 | 93.05% | 13 | 4.30% | 302 |
| Hunting Valley | 146 | 41.01% | 200 | 56.18% | 356 |
| Independence | 1,510 | 37.68% | 2,261 | 56.42% | 4,007 |
| Lakewood | 15,526 | 69.37% | 5,940 | 26.54% | 22,380 |
| Linndale | 21 | 72.41% | 7 | 24.14% | 29 |
| Lyndhurst | 4,521 | 62.97% | 2,440 | 33.98% | 7,180 |
| Maple Heights | 7,102 | 85.00% | 1,034 | 12.38% | 8,355 |
| Mayfield Heights | 4,517 | 60.75% | 2,584 | 34.75% | 7,436 |
| Mayfield Village | 832 | 48.88% | 815 | 47.88% | 1,702 |
| Middleburg Heights | 3,109 | 46.89% | 3,241 | 48.88% | 6,630 |
| Moreland Hills | 1,242 | 59.83% | 774 | 37.28% | 2,076 |
| Newburgh Heights | 301 | 59.14% | 193 | 37.92% | 509 |
| North Olmsted | 7,079 | 50.91% | 6,108 | 43.93% | 13,905 |
| North Randall | 334 | 86.98% | 37 | 9.64% | 384 |
| North Royalton | 5,270 | 39.78% | 7,270 | 54.87% | 13,249 |
| Oakwood | 1,444 | 82.42% | 262 | 14.96% | 1,752 |
| Olmsted Falls | 1,927 | 49.17% | 1,820 | 46.44% | 3,919 |
| Olmsted Township | 2,723 | 47.55% | 2,736 | 47.77% | 5,727 |
| Orange | 1,435 | 75.57% | 414 | 21.80% | 1,899 |
| Parma | 14,121 | 49.33% | 12,859 | 44.92% | 28,624 |
| Parma Heights | 3,801 | 53.16% | 2,996 | 41.90% | 7,150 |
| Pepper Pike | 2,358 | 64.18% | 1,196 | 32.55% | 3,674 |
| Richmond Heights | 3,715 | 76.60% | 998 | 20.58% | 4,850 |
| Rocky River | 5,630 | 50.39% | 5,126 | 45.88% | 11,173 |
| Seven Hills | 2,646 | 43.79% | 3,068 | 50.78% | 6,042 |
| Shaker Heights | 12,483 | 82.16% | 2,251 | 14.82% | 15,193 |
| Solon | 7,090 | 59.41% | 4,370 | 36.61% | 11,935 |
| South Euclid | 7,836 | 78.74% | 1,810 | 18.19% | 9,952 |
| Strongsville | 8,979 | 42.73% | 10,938 | 52.05% | 21,014 |
| University Heights | 3,864 | 71.08% | 1,412 | 25.97% | 5,436 |
| Valley View | 424 | 39.52% | 606 | 56.48% | 1,073 |
| Walton Hills | 527 | 43.41% | 644 | 53.05% | 1,214 |
| Warrensville Heights | 5,041 | 93.70% | 180 | 3.35% | 5,380 |
| Westlake | 7,470 | 46.89% | 7,939 | 49.84% | 15,930 |
| Woodmere | 258 | 87.76% | 28 | 9.52% | 294 |
