= 2010 Cuyahoga County Executive election =

- November 2, 2010
- Turnout: 44.2%
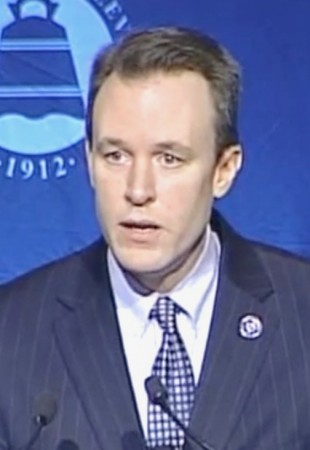

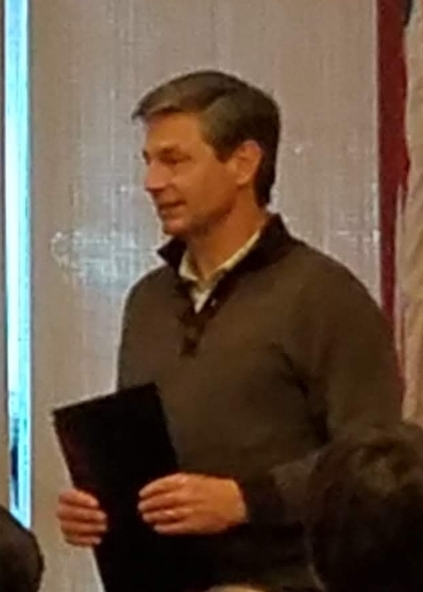
Candidate	Ed FitzGerald	Matt Dolan
Party	Democratic	Republican
Popular vote	188,475	133,646
Percentage	45.7%	30.3%
Candidate	Ken Lanci	Tim McCormack
Party	Independent	Independent
Popular vote	47,110	33,760
Percentage	11.4%	8.2%
- Results by municipality FitzGerald: 30–40% 40–50% 50–60% 60–70% 70–80% 80–90% Dolan: 30–40% 40–50% 50–60% 60–70%
County Executive before election
Office established
Elected County Executive
Ed FitzGerald
Democratic

The 2010 Cuyahoga County Executive election took place on November 2, 2010, to elect the County Executive of Cuyahoga County, Ohio. This was the first held under the newly ratified Charter of Cuyahoga County, which replaced Cuyahoga's 200 year old Board of County Commissioners with an executive and legislature, establishing the office of County Executive.

The Democrats nominated the mayor of Lakewood Ed FitzGerald, while the Republicans nominated former Ohio State Representative Matt Dolan. This was the only Cuyahoga County executive election to date with more than two candidates on the ballot, with the Green Party nominating architect David H. Ellison, and businessmen Ken Lanci and Don Scipione as well as former Cuyahoga County Commissioner Tim McCormack running as independents.

FitzGerald defeated Dolan by approximately 50,000 votes with 45.7% of the vote to Dolan's 30.3%, making it the closest County Executive election in Cuyahoga's history, and the only to be won by a plurality of the vote.

== Democratic primary ==
=== Candidates ===
==== Nominee ====
- Ed FitzGerald, mayor of Lakewood (2008-2010)

==== Eliminated in primary ====
- James F. Brown, bus driver
- Terri Hamilton Brown, executive director of the Cuyahoga Metropolitan Housing Authority (1998-2011)
- Dianna Lynn Hill

=== Primary results ===
Democratic primary results
Party	Candidate	Votes	%
Democratic	Ed FitzGerald	50,012	48.66%
Democratic	Terri Hamilton Brown	33,496	32.59%
Democratic	Dianna Lynn Hill	14,057	13.68%
Democratic	James F. Brown	5,205	5.06%
Total votes		102,770	100.0%

== Republican primary ==
=== Candidates ===
==== Nominee ====
- Matt Dolan, former Ohio State Representative from District 98 (2005-2010)

==== Eliminated in primary ====
- Paul Casey, high school wrestling coach
- Victor S. Voinovich Sr., real estate broker

=== Primary results ===
Republican primary results
Party	Candidate	Votes	%
Republican	Matt Dolan	33,174	68.29%
Republican	Victor S. Voinovich Sr.	9,363	19.27%
Republican	Paul Casey	6,044	12.44%
Total votes		48,581	100.0%

== Green primary ==
=== Candidates ===
==== Nominee ====
- David H. Ellison, architect

=== Primary results ===
Green Party primary results
Party	Candidate	Votes	%
Green	David H. Ellison	420	100.0%
Total votes		420	100.0%

== Independents ==
=== Candidates ===
- Ken Lanci, businessman
- Tim McCormack, former Cuyahoga County commissioner (1997-2004)
- Don Scipione, businessman

== General election ==
=== Results ===
2010 Cuyahoga County executive election
Party	Candidate	Votes	%
Democratic	Ed FitzGerald	188,475	45.73%
Republican	Matt Dolan	124,719	30.26%
Independent	Ken Lanci	47,110	11.43%
Independent	Tim McCormack	33,760	8.19%
Independent	Don Scipione	11,897	2.89%
Green	David H. Ellison	6,193	1.50%
Total votes		412,154	100.0%
Democratic win (new seat)			
