= Warrensville Heights City School District =

School district in Ohio, United States

Address
- 4743 Richmond Road Warrensville Heights, Ohio, 44128; United States

District information
- Type: Public
- Grades: PK–12
- Schools: 4
- NCES District ID: 3904500

Students and staff
- Students: 1,902 (2025–2026)
- Teachers: 144.59 (on an FTE basis) (2025–2026)
- Staff: 211.50 (on an FTE basis) (2025–2026)
- Student–teacher ratio: 13.15 (2025–2026)

Other information
- Website: www.warrensville.k12.oh.us

The Warrensville Heights City School District is a public school district based in Warrensville Heights, Ohio (USA).

In addition to Warrensville Heights, the district also serves the villages of Highland Hills and North Randall.

== Schools ==
=== High school ===
- Grades 9-12
  - Warrensville Heights High School

=== Middle school ===
- Grades 6-8
  - Warrensville Heights Middle School

=== Elementary School ===
- Grades K - 5
  - Warrensville Heights Elementary School

== Enrollment ==
- 2006-07 School Year: 2,536 students
- 2005-06 School Year: 2,859 students
- 2004-05 School Year: 2,828 students
- 2003-04 School Year: 2,821 students
- 2002-03 School Year: 2,996 students

District during the 2010-2011 There Were A Total Of 5,579 There were a total of 2,536 students enrolled in the Warrensville Heights City School District during the 2006-2007 school year. The gender makeup of the district was 48.06% female and 51.94% male. The racial makeup of the district was 98.82% African American, 0.39% White, 0.24% Hispanic, 0.47% Multiracial, and 0.08% Asian/Pacific Islander.

== Athletics ==
Warrensville Heights High School has won 2 OHSAA State Championships. Boys Track and Field 1976

Boys Basketball 2000

State Runner Up in Boys Basketball 2001 Girls Track & Field 2007 and Boys Track and field 1981

== Notable alumni ==
- Arsenio Hall, TV personality
- Sal Bando, Former MLB player (Oakland Athletics, Milwaukee Brewers) and Brewers general manager
- Darnell Sanders, Former Ohio State Buckeye, Former NFL Tight End, Cleveland Browns, Atlanta Falcons, Chicago Bears
- Brad Sellers, Former Ohio State Buckeye, NBA player, Chicago Bulls, current mayor of Warrensville Heights, Ohio
- Yvette Nicole Brown, Actress, singer, comedian
- David Patterson, American football player for the Atlanta Falcons

== See also ==
- List of school districts in Ohio
