= Warrensville Heights High School =

Location
- 4270 Northfield Road; Warrensville Heights, (Cuyahoga County), Ohio 44128; United States; 41°26′35″N 81°31′49″W

Information
- Type: Public, Coeducational high school
- Opened: 1964
- School district: Warrensville Heights City School District
- Superintendent: Donald J. Jolly II
- Principal: Andrea Bishop
- Teaching staff: 47.00 (FTE)
- Grades: 9-12
- Student to teacher ratio: 13.23
- Colors: Blue and Gold
- Athletics conference: United Athletic Conference
- Team name: Tigers
- Website: School Website

Warrensville Heights High School is a public high school located in Warrensville Heights, Ohio. It is the only high school in the Warrensville Heights City School District. Athletic Teams are known as the Tigers, and they compete as a member of the Ohio High School Athletic Association in the United Athletic Conference.

Opened in 1964, Warrensville Heights High School serves students grades 9-12. Its current campus was renovated in 2002.

== Athletics ==
=== State championships ===
- Boys basketball - 2000

== Notable alumni ==
- Sal Bando, Former professional baseball player and manager in the Major League Baseball (MLB)
- Yvette Nicole Brown - actress
- Arsenio Hall - actor
- David Patterson - former professional football player in the National Football League (NFL)
- Darnell Sanders - former professional football player in the National Football League (NFL)
- Brad Sellers - former professional basketball player in the National Basketball Association (NBA) and mayor of Warrensville Heights, Ohio
