= Cuyahoga Community College =

Public college in Cuyahoga County, Ohio, US

Coordinates: 41°26′49″N 81°30′04″W

- Other name: Tri-C
- Type: Public community college
- Established: 1963; 63 years ago
- Parent institution: University System of Ohio
- Academic affiliations: Space-grant
- Endowment: $112.1 million (2025)
- President: Michael Baston
- Students: 15,764 (fall 2022)
- Location: Cuyahoga County, Ohio, United States
- Colors: Teal, black, gray
- Nicknames: Triceratops (previously Challengers)
- Sporting affiliations: NJCAA; OCCAC
- Mascot: Stomp the Triceratops
- Website: www.tri-c.edu

Cuyahoga Community College (Tri-C) is a public community college in Cuyahoga County, Ohio, United States. Founded in 1963, it is the oldest and largest public community college within the state. Not until 1961 had Ohio permitted the establishment of community colleges and Ohio was then one of only four U.S. states without them.

Tri-C schedules on the semester basis, and offers over 1,000 courses in associate degree programs through traditional classroom settings as well as distance learning services and its flagship offering known as Cable College. Cable College has offered classes live through the Cleveland area cable companies since the early 1990s. The institution promotes academic advancement through transfer articulation agreements with four-year colleges and universities. Tri-C is accredited by the Higher Learning Commission.

== Locations ==
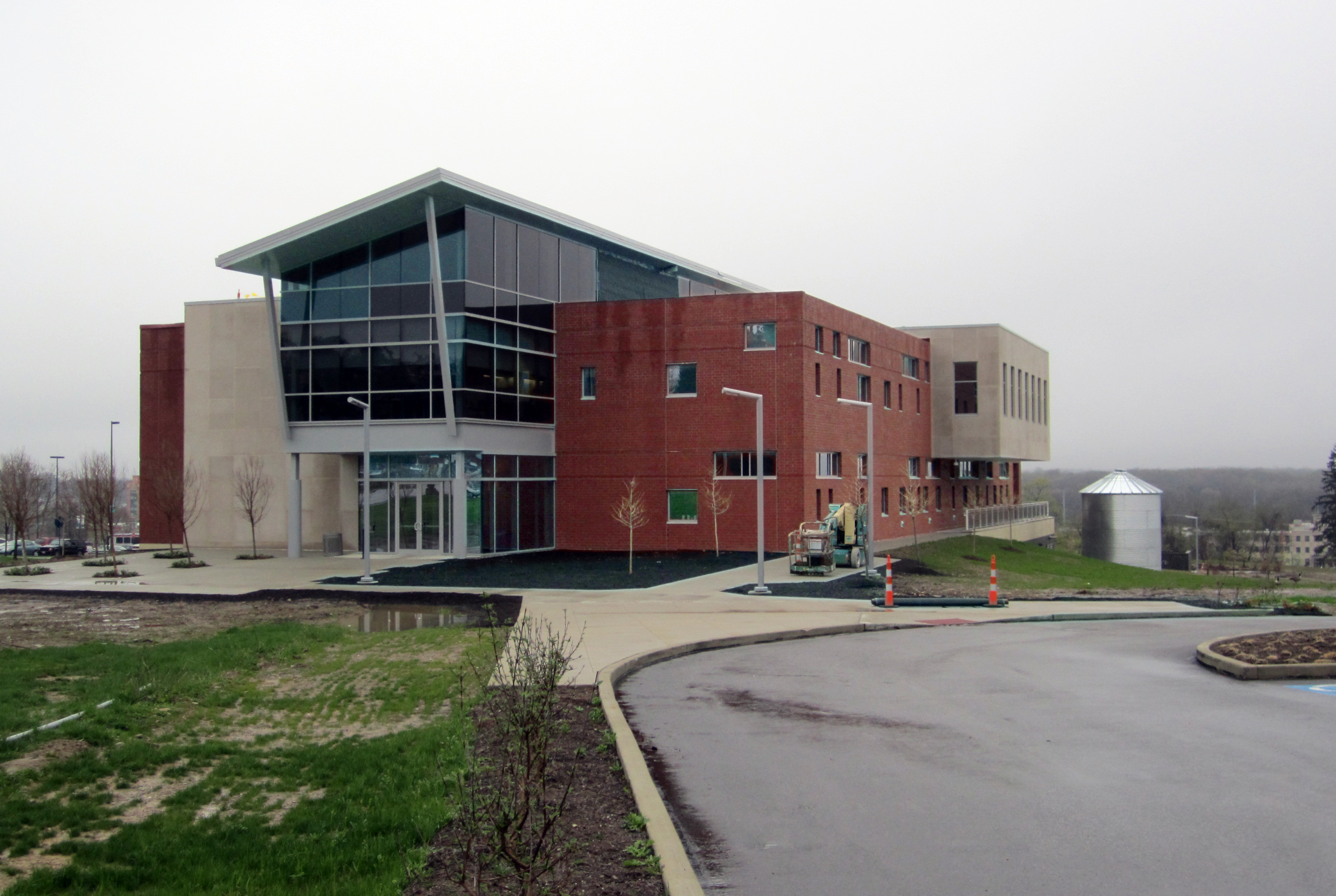
Part of Tri-C's Eastern Campus in Highland Hills

Cuyahoga Community College operates a multi-campus college district in Northeast Ohio. With Cuyahoga County as its primary service area, Tri-C serves Cleveland and the surrounding communities. The four primary campuses include the Eastern Campus in Highland Hills, the Metropolitan Campus of Downtown Cleveland's Campus District, Western Campus in Parma and Parma Heights, and Westshore campus in Westlake. Tri-C houses its district administrative services at a separate location in Cleveland.

An additional facility, the Brunswick University Center in Brunswick, operates as an extension of the Western Campus. The college also operates two Corporate College business training facilities: Corporate College East in Warrensville Heights and Corporate College West in Westlake. Other locations in downtown Cleveland include the Tri-C's Workforce and Economic Development Division (based in the Unified Technologies Center) and the Hospitality Management Center at Public Square.

The Rock and Roll Hall of Fame's Library and Archives are located at the Metropolitan Campus' Gill and Tommy LiPuma Center for Creative Arts.

== Athletics and student life ==
Cuyahoga Community College has the following sports activities.

- Men's Baseball
- Men's Basketball
- Women's Basketball
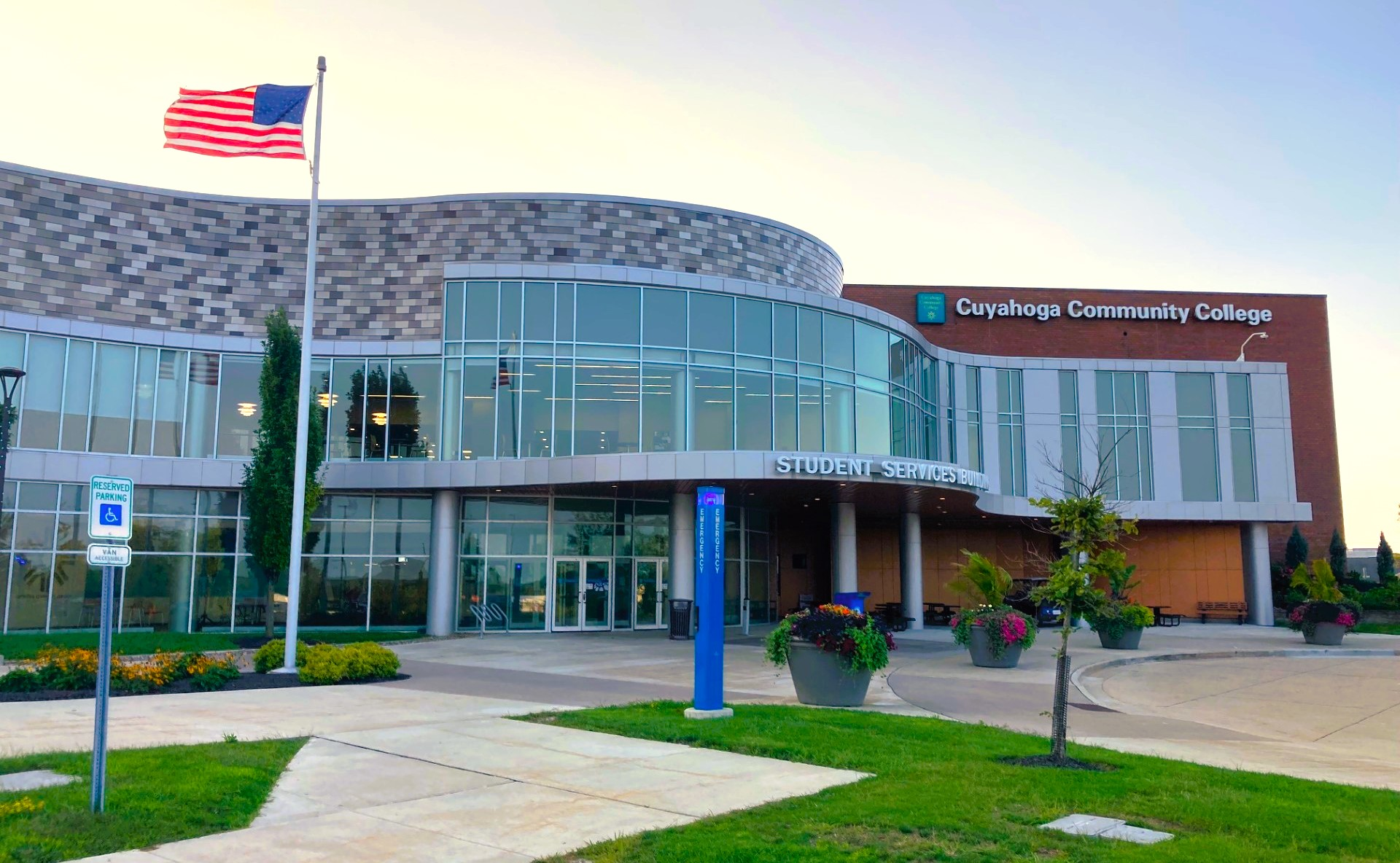
- Student Services Building
  Women's Cross Country & Track
- Women's Softball
- Women's Volleyball
- Men's Soccer

The college also has a variety of activities ranging from involvement in the campus governance systems to fine arts and entertainment programming, and membership in student organizations and clubs.

Cuyahoga Community College has won the following NJCAA national titles:

- Men's Wrestling: 1976
- Men's Basketball: 2004 (Division II)

== Arts ==
Since 1980 Cuyahoga Community College has hosted the Tri-C JazzFest.

== Presidents ==
- Charles Chapman (1962-1973)
- Nolen Ellison (1974-1991)
- Jerry Sue Thornton (1992-2013)
- Alex Johnson (2013-2022)
- Michael A. Baston (2022-Present)

== Notable alumni ==
- Halle Berry, Academy Award Winning actress
- Shontel Brown, U.S. Congresswoman
- Jerome Caja, Performance artist
- Darrin Chapin, Major League Baseball player
- Wayne Dawson, News Broadcaster
- Frank G. Jackson, Mayor of Cleveland
- Dominique Moceanu, 1996 Olympic Gold Medalist
- Dale Mohorcic, Major League Baseball player
- Jeff Shaw, Major League Baseball player
- Ben Wallace, Detroit Pistons, NBA

== See also ==
- List of community colleges
