= North Randall =

North Randall may refer to the following places in the United States:

- North Randall, a township in Thomas County, Kansas
- North Randall, Ohio
