= Chris Ronayne =

3rd Executive of Cuyahoga County, Ohio

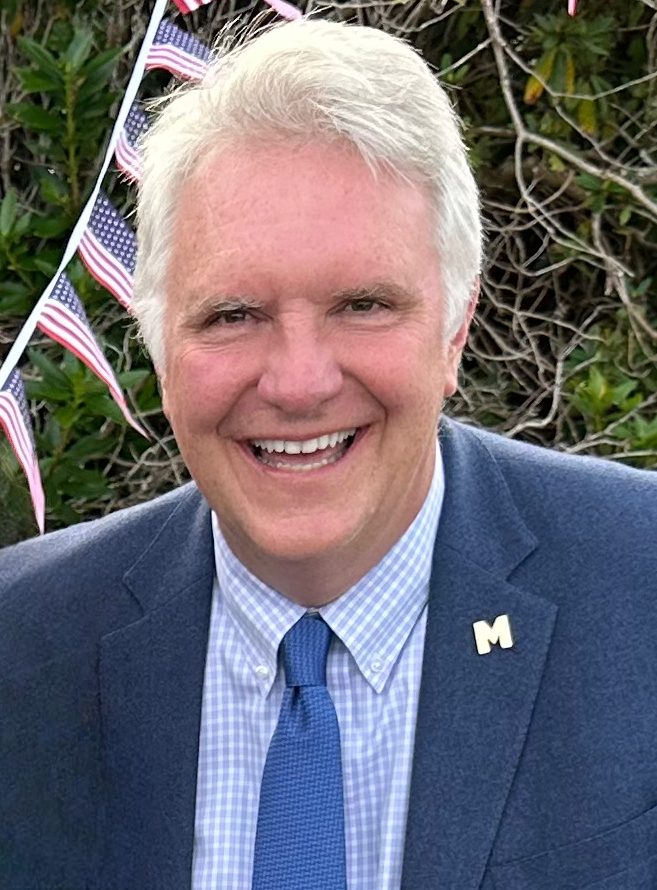

3rd Executive of Cuyahoga County
- Incumbent
- Assumed office January 1, 2023
- Preceded by: Armond Budish

Personal details
- Born: September 2, 1968 (age 58) Chicago, Illinois, U.S.
- Party: Democratic
- Education: Miami University, Cleveland State University

Chris Ronayne is an American politician who currently serves as the 3rd Cuyahoga County Executive. He was elected to the office in 2022, defeating Lee Weingart with 63.9% of the vote. Ronayne took office on January 1, 2023.

== Early life ==
Chris Ronayne was born in Chicago, Illinois on September 2, 1968 to Kathleen and James Ronayne. He attended Bay High School, west of Cleveland, where he was captain of the school's hockey team. Following high school, Ronayne went to Miami University and later received a Master of Urban Planning and Development from Cleveland State University.

== Career ==
Ronayne began his career on the Cuyahoga County Planning Commission prior to serving as campaign manager for then-Cuyahoga County Commissioner Jane Campbell’s successful run for Cleveland Mayor in 2001. He then served in Campbell's administration as the City of Cleveland Planning Director. Ronayne also worked as the city's Chief of Staff and Chief Development Officer. In 2005, Ronayne was named president of University Circle Inc, a non-profit that oversees the University Circle neighborhood on Cleveland's East Side. On October 1, 2021, Ronayne stepped down as UCI President to run for Cuyahoga County Executive.

== County Executive ==
The 2022 Cuyahoga County executive election was for an open seat, as incumbent Armond Budish chose not to run for a third term. After defeating Tariq Shabbaz in the Democratic primary, Ronayne faced the Republican nominee, former county commissioner Lee Weingart. Cuyahoga County, a Democratic stronghold, gave 247,301 votes, nearly 110,000 more than Weingart received. Ronayne was sworn in on January 1 of the following year, but had a ceremonial inauguration in Downtown Cleveland on January 21.

Ronayne began his tenure focusing on issues relating to the homeless and public transportation. As part of this emphasis, he created a new department of Housing and Community Development and appointed a Senior Advisor for Transportation. He has also called for economic development efforts alongside Lake Erie, which makes up the northern border of Cuyahoga County. Additionally, Ronayne prioritized waterfront access, affordable housing and improved resident services during his campaign. Since taking office, he has championed the creation of Neighborhood Based Services as a way to decentralize social services offered by county government. Ronayne said Cuyahoga County would keep $16 million invested in Israel Bonds.

Two days after his election, Ronayne named former Sandusky city manager Eric Wobser as his chief of staff. He also appointed Cleveland Deputy Police Chief Harold Pretel as Cuyahoga County Sheriff.

== Personal life ==
He is married to Natalie Ronayne, who is the Chief Development Officer for the Cleveland Metroparks. They have two kids. He has previously been named to Crain's Cleveland's 40 under 40 list and Cleveland Magazine's Most Interesting People 2023 list.
