= 2001 Cleveland mayoral election =

- November 6, 2001
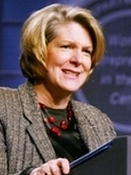

Candidate	Jane L. Campbell	Raymond C. Pierce
Party	Nonpartisan	Nonpartisan
Popular vote	59,257	50,513
Percentage	53.98%	46.02%
Mayor before election
Michael R. White
Democratic
Elected mayor
Jane L. Campbell
Democratic

The 2001 Cleveland mayoral election took place on November 6, 2001, to elect the Mayor of Cleveland, Ohio. The election was officially nonpartisan, with the top two candidates from the October 2 primary advancing to the general election, regardless of party.

Incumbent mayor Michael R. White decided not to run for re-election to a fourth term in office.

== Candidates ==
- John E. Barnes, Jr., Ohio State Representative (Democrat)
- Dan Brady, Ohio State Senator (Democrat)
- Jane L. Campbell, Cuyahoga County Commissioner (Democrat)
- Irv Chudner
- Bill Denihan
- Tim McCormack, former Ohio State Senator (Democrat)
- Mary Rose Oakar, former U.S. Representative (Democrat)
- Raymond C. Pierce, former Department of Education Deputy Assistant Secretary for Civil Rights (Democrat)
- Ricky L. Pittman
- Kent A. Whitley

== Primary election ==
Primary election results
Party	Candidate	Votes	%
Nonpartisan	Jane L. Campbell	24,453	29.87
Nonpartisan	Raymond C. Pierce	23,457	28.66
Nonpartisan	Mary Rose Oakar	15,785	19.28
Nonpartisan	Tim McCormack	12,563	15.35
Nonpartisan	Bill Denihan	1,935	2.36
Nonpartisan	Dan Brady	1,526	1.86
Nonpartisan	John E. Barnes, Jr.	1,178	1.44
Nonpartisan	Ricky L. Pittman	468	0.57
Nonpartisan	Irv Chudner	307	0.38
Nonpartisan	Kent A. Whitley	168	0.21
Write-In	Write-in	19	0.02
Total votes		81,859	100.00

== General election ==
Cleveland mayoral election, 2001
Party	Candidate	Votes	%
Nonpartisan	Jane L. Campbell	59,257	53.98
Nonpartisan	Raymond C. Pierce	50,513	46.02
Total votes		109,770	100.00
