= County Executive of Cuyahoga County, Ohio =

- Flag of Cuyahoga County

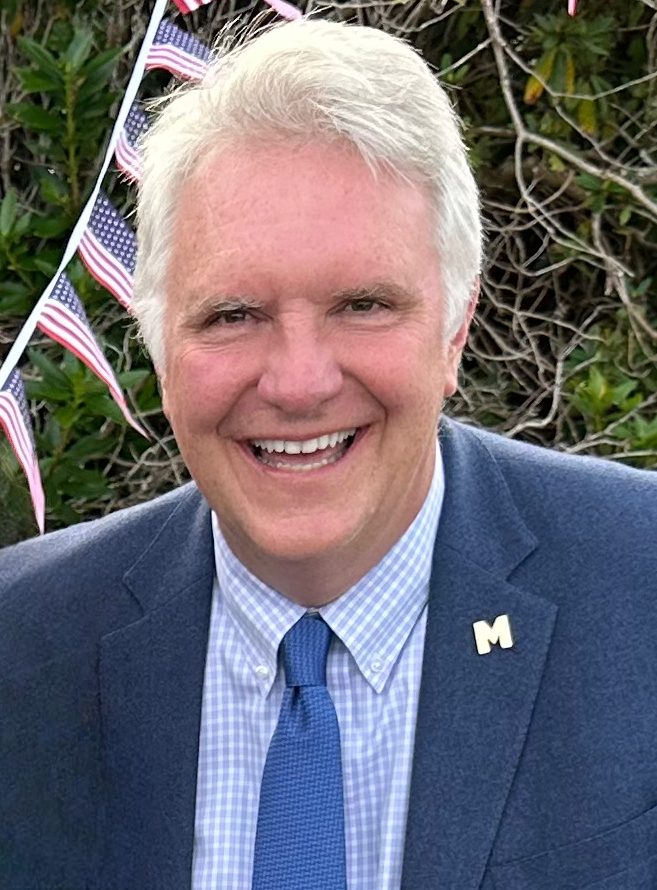
- Incumbent; Chris Ronayne since January 1, 2023
- Style: The Honorable
- Term length: Four years. No term limits.
- Constituting instrument: Charter of Cuyahoga County
- Inaugural holder: Ed FitzGerald
- Formation: January 1, 2011
- Salary: $175,000
- Website: executive.cuyahogacounty.us

The county executive of Cuyahoga County, the second largest county in Ohio, and the 29th largest county by population in the United States, is the elected chief executive of the Cuyahoga County government. Democrat Chris Ronayne is the current county executive. The county charter stipulates that the executive is responsible for the appointment and removal of county personnel, working with other local governments, introducing legislation to the county council, submitting budgets and capital improvements plans to the council, and many other duties.

== Formation ==
After a widespread corruption scandal was revealed, the voters of Cuyahoga County, which includes the City of Cleveland and 58 surrounding suburbs, voted to authorize a new form of county government on November 3, 2009. The charter replaced three county commissioners with an executive and 11-member council. Under the charter, other previously elected posts, such as sheriff, treasurer, and clerk of courts became appointed positions under the executive. Summit County is the only other county in Ohio with a county executive.

Democrat Ed FitzGerald, the then-mayor of Lakewood, Ohio, defeated Matt Dolan in the initial election in November 2010 and was sworn in as the first Cuyahoga County executive on January 1, 2011 and inaugurated on January 9.

== Political implications ==
After FitzGerald was elected, The Plain Dealer political reporter Henry J. Gomez wrote that many observers believed the county executive job would "be second only to the governor in terms of power and constituency." This prediction seemed to foreshadow FitzGerald's decision to challenge John Kasich's re-election bid for governor of Ohio in 2014. FitzGerald was the Democratic nominee for the November election. However, he was defeated.

== Elections ==
After FitzGerald chose to run for Governor of Ohio in 2014, then-state Representative Armond Budish was elected to succeed him. Budish was reelected in 2018, but chose not to run again in 2022. Democrat Chris Ronayne defeated Republican Lee Weingart in the November 2022 election to become the third person to hold the office.

== County executives ==
#	Portrait	Name	Term in office	Party affiliation	Previous office
1		Ed FitzGerald (born 1968; age 58)	January 9, 2011 – December 31, 2014	Democratic	Mayor of Lakewood, Ohio
2		Armond Budish (born 1953; age 73)	January 1, 2015 – December 31, 2022	Democratic	Speaker of the Ohio House of Representatives
3		Chris Ronayne (born 1968; age 58)	January 1, 2023 – Incumbent	Democratic	CEO of University Circle Inc.
