= Jim Rokakis =

Ohio politician and land bank advocate

Director of the Thriving Communities Institute, Western Reserve Land Conservancy
- In office March 2011 – January 1, 2021
- Preceded by: Position established
- Succeeded by: Matt Zone

Chairman of the Cuyahoga County Land Reutilization Corporation
- In office 2009–2011
- Preceded by: Position established

Member of the Ohio foreclosure task force
- Incumbent
- Assumed office 2007
- Appointed by: Ted Strickland

Treasurer of Cuyahoga County
- In office March 1997 – January 2011
- Preceded by: Francis E. Gaul
- Succeeded by: Mark Parks (acting)

Member of the Cleveland City Council
- In office 1978–1997
- Constituency: Ward 6 (renumbered Ward 15)

Personal details
- Born: James Rokakis; 1955 (age 70–71) Cleveland, Ohio, U.S.
- Party: Democratic
- Spouse: Laurie Rokakis
- Children: 3
- Parent: Manousos Rokakis (father)
- Education: Oberlin College; Cleveland-Marshall College of Law (JD)
- Occupation: Politician, nonprofit executive
- Profession: Lawyer
- Known for: Early warnings of the subprime mortgage crisis in Cleveland; Ohio county land banks; Cleveland Municipal Housing Court
- Awards: Homer C. Wadsworth Award, Cleveland Foundation (2016)

James "Jim" Rokakis (born 1955) is an American former Democratic politician from Cleveland, Ohio. He served on Cleveland City Council from 1978 to 1997 and as treasurer of Cuyahoga County from 1997 to 2011. On the council he and state senator Charles Butts pressed for a court dedicated to Cleveland's housing cases, which until then had been heard in rotation by the 12 judges of the city's municipal court. The Ohio General Assembly created the Cleveland Municipal Housing Court in 1980. As treasurer he warned from the early 2000s about subprime lending in the Cleveland area and testified several times before congressional committees on mortgage foreclosures. He also pressed for the 2008 Ohio law that allowed counties to create land banks, beginning with the Cuyahoga Land Bank.

From 2011 to 2020 he directed the Thriving Communities Institute, a Western Reserve Land Conservancy program that promoted county land banks across Ohio. In 2020 he and Gus Frangos published The Land Bank Revolution, a book on the creation of Ohio's county land banks.

== Early life and education ==
Rokakis was born in 1955 and is a native of Cleveland. His father, Manousos Rokakis, had come to Cleveland from the Greek island of Crete. The family lived in public housing in the Valley View projects in Tremont. In November 1959, when Rokakis was four, they bought a house. He grew up in Cleveland's Brooklyn Centre neighborhood.

He graduated from Oberlin College with a degree in government and urban studies. He earned a law degree from Cleveland-Marshall College of Law and was admitted to the bar in 1983.

== Career ==
=== Cleveland City Council ===
Rokakis was elected to Cleveland City Council on November 8, 1977, at the age of 22. His campaign literature urged voters to "elect a councilman who cares for this neighborhood too much to watch it die". He became a council member in 1978. He represented Ward 6, which was later renumbered Ward 15. He served on the council for 19 years, the last seven as chairman of its Finance Committee.

In January 2011 the council passed a resolution recognizing his more than 32 years of public service. The resolution credited him with helping to lead downtown projects, among them the Gateway Sports Complex and the Rock and Roll Hall of Fame. It also credited him with creating the city's gun buy-back program.

==== Cleveland Housing Court ====
At Oberlin, Rokakis wrote his senior thesis on housing courts. In the late 1970s, as a council member, he and state senator Charles Butts argued that Cleveland needed a court of special jurisdiction to take evictions and criminal housing-code cases off the general municipal docket. In their view, these cases harmed the city's neighborhoods and deserved more attention than the municipal court gave them. Rokakis made about half a dozen trips to Columbus to lobby for the court.

Before the court existed, housing cases went in rotation to the 12 judges of the Cleveland Municipal Court, and each stage of a code-violation prosecution, from arraignment to sentencing, could come before a different judge. Neighborhood residents, public interest lawyers, planners and directors of community development corporations joined the campaign for the court. The Ohio General Assembly created the Cleveland Municipal Housing Court in 1980. It began hearing cases on April 2 of that year as a division of the municipal court. Robert Jaquay, the court's prosecutor in the early 1980s, wrote in 2005 that its creation had been seen both as an urban reform and as a victory for grassroots advocacy.

When Raymond Pianka, the court's judge since 1996, died in 2017, Crain's Cleveland Business described Rokakis as one of the court's founders. Rokakis said of Pianka: "Someone like Ray was who we designed the court for."

=== Cuyahoga County Treasurer ===
Rokakis was the Democratic candidate for Cuyahoga County treasurer in 1996, running against Republican Virgil E. Brown Jr. He was elected that year and took office in March 1997. The treasurer collected property taxes and distributed the money to school districts and city governments.

Rokakis spearheaded Ohio House Bill 294, which streamlined the foreclosure of abandoned properties. He also worked for the passage of House Bill 371, which allowed treasurers in Ohio's largest counties to sell property-tax liens to private buyers. By March 2007 Governor Ted Strickland had appointed him to a newly formed state task force on foreclosures.

According to NPR, Rokakis traced Cleveland's foreclosure problem to the 1990s. At that time, he told NPR, he began to notice an increase in home loans that had "no visible means of support". In 2000 he took his concerns about securitized home loans to the Federal Reserve. In March 2001 he sponsored a conference on predatory lending in Ohio.

He worked with the county commissioners, among them Peter Lawson Jones and especially Tim Hagan, to fund a county foreclosure-prevention program. The program started in March 2006 and was run from the treasurer's office. He also pressed the county courts to speed up their handling of foreclosure cases. In early 2007 the house in which Rokakis grew up stood vacant after a bank foreclosure and had been stripped by thieves. He went to its auction in March but did not bid.

Between 2007 and 2010 Rokakis testified about foreclosures in Cuyahoga County before three bodies:

- the Joint Economic Committee;
- the Senate Banking Committee;
- a subcommittee of the House Oversight Committee.

In July 2007 he told the Joint Economic Committee that private mortgage foreclosure filings in the county had risen from more than 3,300 in 1995 to 13,610 in 2006. In 2008 NPR reported that the county had recorded 80,000 foreclosures since 2000, the most per capita in the United States. In 2010 NPR said Rokakis had warned of a foreclosure crisis for eight years before it drew wide notice in the fall of 2008.

In December 2009 Rokakis announced a six-month moratorium on foreclosures for unpaid property taxes. Officials expected it to cover about 1,700 homes already in the foreclosure process. They expected about 1,700 more to fall behind over the following six months. Taxes, penalties and interest continued to accrue during the moratorium. The same month he said he would not run for the new office of county executive, which had been created by the passage of Issue 6. Under the new county government the treasurer was no longer elected. Rokakis left office in January 2011.

=== Cuyahoga Land Bank ===
Rokakis later described the order of the legislation he and Gus Frangos pursued: "We first passed a bill that helped us speed up foreclosures, and then we passed a bill that allowed for the creation of county land banks." Frangos was a lawyer who served as Rokakis's deputy treasurer.

The land bank law allowed counties to form nonprofit land reutilization corporations that could acquire abandoned property and prepare it for reuse. Rokakis persuaded the Ohio legislature to approve it, and Frangos was its lead author. The legislature approved it in December 2008. At first the law applied only to Cuyahoga County, as a pilot. Within months it was amended so that other counties could form land banks.

The Plain Dealer columnist Kevin O'Brien wrote that Rokakis "spent countless hours in Columbus, sweating and swearing and sweet-talking Ohio legislators" to win its passage. O'Brien also named Cleveland housing judge Ray Pianka and councilman Tony Brancatelli among the idea's advocates. Reviewing the authors' 2020 book, Kermit J. Lind described Rokakis and Frangos as the primary authors of two laws: a property-tax law change and Ohio's statute on land reutilization corporations.

The Cuyahoga County Land Reutilization Corporation opened in 2009 with Frangos as its president. Rokakis chaired it. The land bank was modeled on a program in Genesee County, Michigan. Rokakis said its immediate goal was to demolish dilapidated houses to raise the value of the remaining properties. By November 2011 it held more than 1,200 properties. It acquired properties in part through partnerships with Fannie Mae and the U.S. Department of Housing and Urban Development.

=== Thriving Communities Institute ===
In March 2011 Rokakis joined the Western Reserve Land Conservancy to create the Thriving Communities Institute and became its director. The institute was a subsidiary of the Land Conservancy, supported by corporate and philanthropic funding. It promoted land banking across Ohio. Rokakis helped counties set up and finance land banks and raised money to demolish vacant houses. In February 2012 he praised Ohio's decision to set aside $75 million from a national mortgage settlement for demolition. He also backed a proposal by Representative Steve LaTourette for disaster-style federal bonds to pay for more demolition.

In December 2011 Rokakis appeared on CBS's 60 Minutes. He took correspondent Scott Pelley through vacant houses in the Cleveland area that scrap thieves had stripped of siding, plumbing and furnaces.

Rokakis was among the advocates who looked for new sources of demolition money for hard-hit cities. He turned to the Hardest Hit Fund, a federal program created in 2010 to help homeowners in the states worst affected by the housing crash avoid foreclosure. By June 2013 Senator Rob Portman had proposed a bill to let the fund pay for demolition, a change Rokakis was seeking. Rokakis estimated that abandoned houses were a billion-dollar problem in Ohio. Bill Faith of the Coalition on Homelessness and Housing in Ohio opposed diverting the money from foreclosure prevention. In August 2013 the Treasury Department allowed Ohio to spend up to $60 million of its remaining Hardest Hit money on demolition.

The Plain Dealer credited a study commissioned by the Thriving Communities Institute with persuading the Treasury and described Rokakis as the architect of the strategy. The study found that demolishing blighted buildings in Cleveland stabilized and raised property values and reduced foreclosures and tax delinquencies. In February 2014 the Ohio Housing Finance Agency divided the first $49.5 million among 11 counties and cities, with the largest share, $10.1 million, going to Cuyahoga County. According to FreshWater Cleveland, the institute later helped secure an additional $2 billion for the fund, from which Ohio received $192 million for removing blighted properties.

In September 2020 the Land Conservancy announced that Cleveland councilman Matt Zone would succeed Rokakis as head of the Thriving Communities program. By 2021, according to Lind, land reutilization corporations operated in 57 of Ohio's 88 counties.

== Writing ==
With Frangos, Rokakis wrote The Land Bank Revolution: How Ohio's Communities Fought Back Against the Foreclosure Crisis (Cleveland: Parafine Press, 2020). Each author narrates his own part in the legislation and in the land bank's development. Rokakis's chapters describe the growth of foreclosures and of abandoned, tax-delinquent properties. They also describe what he presents as the failure of government at all levels to respond in time.

Reviewing the book in the Journal of Urban Affairs, Lind called it "both a memoir and a detailed guidebook on the development of a high-capacity, countywide land bank". He wrote that it was aimed at readers beyond lawyers, including policymakers, planners and advocates.

== Views on the foreclosure crisis ==
Rokakis has attributed Cleveland's foreclosures to speculative and loosely underwritten lending. In 2008 he told NPR that speculators had bought several Cleveland houses at a time, hoping to profit at closing. In July 2007 he told the Joint Economic Committee that many buyers "had horrible credit to begin with" and "put nothing down". He added that "the broker, the mortgage banker and Wall Street knew all of this, but the money was too good, the profits too powerful to ignore". On 60 Minutes he described the market from 2000 to 2006 as one in which "this wasn't people looking for money, this was money looking for people". He explained how this was the reason many loans were made without down payments or verification of income.

He criticized the federal response. In 2010 he told NPR that the Home Affordable Modification Program depended on voluntary participation by banks, which made it unlikely to work. Rokakis also said that bank lobbyists had stopped a mortgage bill backed by Senator Dick Durbin. He argued that lenders should write down the principal on underwater mortgages. In his view this would preserve more value than letting houses go vacant and be vandalized.

== Awards and honors ==
In 2003 the Environmental Protection Agency gave a National Award for Smart Growth Achievement to the treasurer's office for the Home Enhancement Loan Program, which Rokakis had developed. Under the program the county worked with banks to offer below-market home-improvement loans in Cleveland and its first-ring suburbs.

In 2007 American City & County magazine named Rokakis its County Leader of the Year. In 2016 the Cleveland Foundation gave him its Homer C. Wadsworth Award, which is named for the foundation's executive director from 1974 to 1983 and given each year to a local leader in civic, volunteer, nonprofit or public-sector work.

== Personal life ==
Rokakis is married to Laurie Rokakis and they have three children.
