= Wayne Dawson =

American journalist

- Born: 1955 or 1956 (age 70–71)
- Occupation: Television news anchor

Wayne Dawson is an American television newscaster and co-host of Fox 8 in the Morning, a morning show broadcast on Fox affiliate WJW-TV Channel 8, in Cleveland, Ohio. For two years prior to joining WJW in 1981, Dawson was an anchor/reporter at WNIR-FM in Kent, Ohio. A graduate of Cuyahoga Community College, Wayne moved on to Kent State University and graduated in 1979 with a Bachelor of Arts degree in journalism. Dawson currently lives in the suburb of Highland Heights, Ohio. As of 2026 He is also pastor at Grace Tabernacle Baptist Church in Lyndhurst, Ohio.

== Career achievements and honors ==
An eight-time regional Emmy Award winner (Lower Great Lakes-NATAS), Dawson is also a member of the NAACP and the Phi Beta Sigma fraternity. He was inducted into the Broadcasters Hall of Fame (located in Akron, Ohio) in 2000 and the National Association of Black Journalists Hall of Fame in 2025.

== Health ==
In 2024 and 2025 Dawson was treated for oral cancer. In May 2025 he announced that he was cancer free.

== Memoir ==
- Dawson, Wayne; Young, Deante (2022). The Seeds of Greatness Are Within You: A Memoir. Dirty Truth Publishing. ISBN 978-1-73694-666-4.
