= 2014 Ohio gubernatorial election =

- November 4, 2014
- Turnout: 40.65% (registered voters) ▼8.57pp
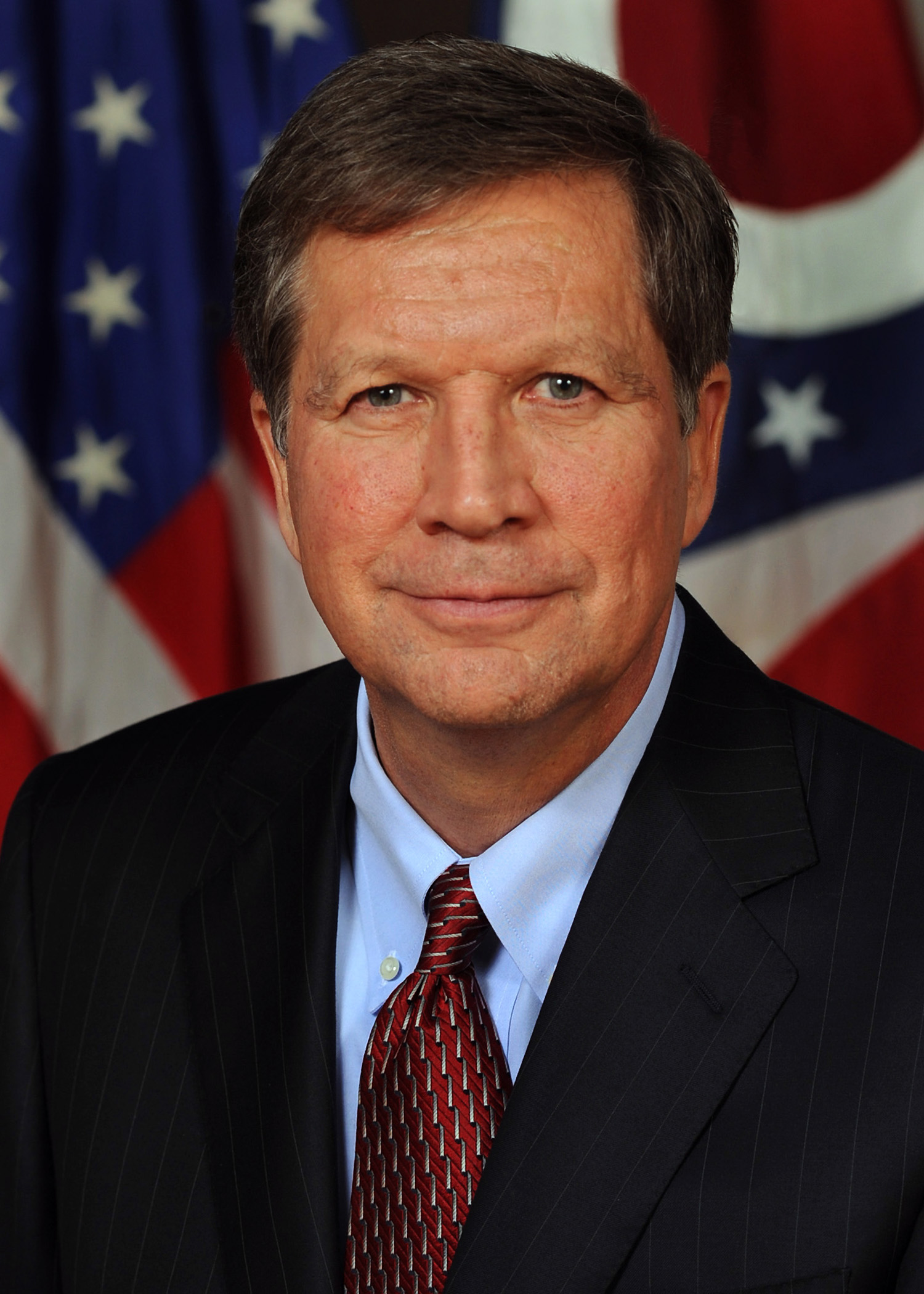

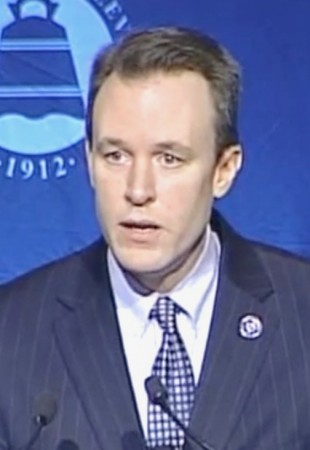
Nominee	John Kasich	Ed FitzGerald
Party	Republican	Democratic
Running mate	Mary Taylor	Sharen Neuhardt
Popular vote	1,944,848	1,009,359
Percentage	63.64%	33.03%
- Kasich: 40–50% 50–60% 60–70% 70–80% 80–90% >90% FitzGerald: 40–50% 50–60% 60–70% 70–80% 80–90% >90% Tie: 50% No data
Governor before election
John Kasich
Republican
Elected Governor
John Kasich
Republican

The 2014 Ohio gubernatorial election took place on November 4, 2014. Incumbent Republican Governor John Kasich won a second term by a landslide over Democratic candidate Ed FitzGerald and Green Party candidate Anita Rios. Primary elections were held on May 6, 2014.

Kasich's landslide victory gave him the highest percentage of the vote since George Voinovich's win in 1994, a large improvement from his narrow victory in 2010. As of 2024, this was the last time the counties of Cuyahoga and Franklin voted for the Republican candidate and the last time Monroe County voted for the Democratic candidate.

This was one of the nine Republican-held governorships up for election in a state that Barack Obama won in the 2012 presidential election.

== Background ==
Kasich, who was elected with Tea Party support in 2010, faced considerable backlash from the movement. His decision to accept the Patient Protection and Affordable Care Act's expansion of Medicaid, his increased spending, taxation of fracking on Ohio farmland and perceived failure to go far enough on charter schools and school vouchers caused Tea Party groups to refuse to support his campaign. When Kasich passed over Tea Party leader Tom Zawistowski for the position of executive director of the Ohio Republican Party in favor of Matt Borges, who worked with a gay rights group, that was widely seen as the last straw. Tea Party groups announced they would support a primary challenger, or, if none emerged, the Libertarian nominee. Zawistowski said, "John Kasich is going to lose in 2014. We don't care who else wins." Ultimately, Kasich was unopposed in the Republican primary.

== Republican primary ==
=== Candidates ===
==== Declared ====
- John Kasich, incumbent governor
  - Running mate: Mary Taylor, incumbent lieutenant governor

==== Withdrawn ====
- Donald Allen, veterinarian and candidate for the U.S. House of Representatives in 2010
  - Running mate: Kelly Kohls, education activist and chair of the Warren County Tea Party
- Ted Stevenot, president of the Ohio Liberty Coalition

=== Results ===
Republican primary results
Party	Candidate	Votes	%
Republican	John Kasich (incumbent); Mary Taylor (incumbent)	559,671	100.00
Total votes		559,671	100.00

== Democratic primary ==
=== Candidates ===
==== Declared ====
- Larry Ealy, former tow truck operator, former male stripper, perennial candidate and vexatious litigant
  - Running mate: Ken Gray, nurse
- Ed FitzGerald, County Executive of Cuyahoga County and former mayor of Lakewood
  - Running mate: Sharen Neuhardt, attorney, nominee for Ohio's 7th congressional district in 2008 and for Ohio's 10th congressional district in 2012

==== Withdrew ====
- Todd Portune, Hamilton County Commissioner

==== Declined ====
- Michael B. Coleman, mayor of Columbus
- Richard Cordray, director of the Consumer Financial Protection Bureau and former Ohio Attorney General
- Tim Ryan, U.S. representative
- Ted Strickland, former governor
- Betty Sutton, former U.S. representative

=== Results ===
Results by county: FitzGerald: 60–70%; 70–80%; 80–90%

Democratic primary results
Party	Candidate	Votes	%
Democratic	Ed FitzGerald; Sharen Neuhardt	366,056	83.15
Democratic	Larry Ealy; Ken Gray	74,197	16.85
Total votes		440,253	100.00

== Green primary ==
=== Candidates ===
==== Declared ====
- Anita Rios, nominee for lieutenant governor of Ohio in 2006 and 2010 and candidate for the U.S. Senate in 2012
  - Running mate: Bob Fitrakis, author and perennial candidate

==== Disqualified ====
- Dennis Spisak, perennial candidate (failed to gather enough valid signatures)
  - Running mate: Suzanne Patzer, information technology supervisor

=== Results ===
Green Party primary results
Party	Candidate	Votes	%
Green	Anita Rios; Bob Fitrakis	674	100.00
Total votes		674	100.00

== Libertarian primary ==
Charlie Earl gathered enough raw signatures to obtain ballot access. However, he was removed from the ballot because technical faults in collection rendered many of his signatures invalid. The decision was appealed in federal court.

=== Candidates ===
==== Disqualified ====
- Charlie Earl, former Republican state representative
  - Running mate: Sherry Clark, newspaper publisher

== General election ==
=== Campaign ===
FitzGerald released a plan for state-funded universal preschool in addition to announcing his support for gay marriage. He criticized Kasich for signing into law income tax cuts that save larger sums of money for wealthier Ohioans than poorer ones, while increasing sales taxes, which tax a larger percentage of income from poorer Ohioans than from wealthier ones. FitzGerald also chided Kasich for a lack of transparency at JobsOhio, the privatized economic development agency that Kasich formed, and for signing into law bills that cut early voting days and limit the distribution of absentee ballot applications. FitzGerald faced several scandals that damaged his candidacy, most notably the revelations that he had driven for several years without a valid driver's license, him being found in a car late at night with a woman who was not his wife, and that his initial running mate, State Sen. Eric Kearney, owed over $1 million in unpaid taxes. Additionally, FitzGerald consistently trailed Kasich in fundraising throughout the entire campaign.

=== Endorsements ===
John Kasich

Newspapers

- The Cincinnati Enquirer
- The Columbus Dispatch
- The Plain Dealer

Organizations

- Indiana/Kentucky/Ohio Regional Council of Carpenters
- International Union of Operating Engineers Local 18
- National Federation of Independent Business
- Ohio Chamber of Commerce
- Ohio Restaurant Association
Ed Fitzgerald

Individuals

- Sherrod Brown, United States senator (D-OH)
- Michael B. Coleman, mayor of Columbus
- Frank G. Jackson, mayor of Cleveland
- Marcy Kaptur, U.S. representative (D-OH-9)
- Ted Strickland, former governor of Ohio

Organizations

- Ohio AFL–CIO
- Ohio Civil Service Employees Association
- Ohio Education Association
- Ohio Federation of Teachers
- Service Employees International Union
- United Automobile Workers
- United Food and Commercial Workers

=== Predictions ===
Source	Ranking	As of
The Cook Political Report	Solid R	November 3, 2014
Sabato's Crystal Ball	Safe R	November 3, 2014
Rothenberg Political Report	Safe R	November 3, 2014
Real Clear Politics	Safe R	November 3, 2014

=== Polling ===
Poll source	Date(s) administered	Sample size	Margin of error	John Kasich (R)	Ed FitzGerald (D)	Other	Undecided
The Columbus Dispatch	October 22–31, 2014	1,009	± 3.3%	62%	34%	—	4%
Fox News	October 28–30, 2014	803	± 3%	51%	36%	2%	11%
CBS News/NYT/YouGov	October 16–23, 2014	2,728	± 3%	54%	35%	1%	10%
CBS News/NYT/YouGov	September 20 – October 1, 2014	3,082	± 2%	52%	36%	1%	11%
Quinnipiac	September 24–29, 2014	999	± 3.1%	57%	35%	2%	7%
The Columbus Dispatch	September 3–5, 2014	1,185	± 2.9%	59%	29%	3%	10%
CBS News/NYT/YouGov	August 18 – September 2, 2014	2,978	± 3%	50%	37%	2%	11%
Rasmussen Reports	September 8–9, 2014	780	± 4%	50%	30%	—	20%
Buckeye Poll	August 31, 2014	600	± 4%	46%	27%	4%	23%
Public Policy Polling^	August 8–9, 2014	801	± ?	50%	44%	—	6%
Quinnipiac	July 24–28, 2014	1,366	± 2.7%	48%	36%	1%	15%
CBS News/NYT/YouGov	July 5–24, 2014	3,624	± ?	49%	43%	1%	7%
Public Policy Polling^	July 9–10, 2014	889	± ?	45%	44%	—	11%
Quinnipiac	May 7–12, 2014	1,174	± 2.9%	50%	35%	1%	13%
Public Policy Polling^	May 9–11, 2014	740	± ?	47%	43%	—	10%
Rasmussen Reports	May 7–8, 2014	750	± 4%	45%	38%	4%	13%
SurveyUSA	April 24–28, 2014	618	± 4%	46%	36%	4%	14%
Magellan Strategies	April 14–15, 2014	857	± 3.35%	47%	41%	5%	7%
Public Policy Polling^	April 14–15, 2014	1,050	± ?	44%	44%	—	11%
Quinnipiac	February 12–17, 2014	1,370	± 2.7%	43%	38%	1%	18%
Public Policy Polling	December 6–8, 2013	1,011	± 3.1%	40%	38%	6%	16%
Quinnipiac	November 19–24, 2013	1,361	± 2.7%	44%	37%	2%	19%
Public Policy Polling^	November 5–6, 2013	595	± 4%	41%	41%	6%	13%
Public Policy Polling	August 16–19, 2013	551	± 4.2%	35%	38%	—	27%
Quinnipiac	June 18–23, 2013	941	± 3.2%	47%	33%	1%	19%
Quinnipiac	April 10–15, 2013	1,138	± 2.9%	46%	37%	1%	17%
Quinnipiac	February 21–26, 2013	1,011	± 3.1%	45%	35%	1%	19%

Hypothetical polling

Poll source	Date(s) administered	Sample size	Margin of error	John Kasich (R)	Michael B. Coleman (D)	Other	Undecided
Public Policy Polling	June 21–24, 2012	673	± 3.8%	43%	36%	—	22%

Poll source	Date(s) administered	Sample size	Margin of error	John Kasich (R)	Richard Cordray (D)	Other	Undecided
Quinnipiac	June 18–23, 2013	941	± 3.2%	47%	36%	1%	17%
Quinnipiac	April 10–15, 2013	1,138	± 2.9%	45%	38%	2%	15%
Quinnipiac	February 21–26, 2013	1,011	± 3.1%	44%	38%	1%	18%
Public Policy Polling	June 21–24, 2012	673	± 3.8%	41%	40%	—	19%
Public Policy Polling	May 3–6, 2012	875	± 3.3%	42%	42%	—	16%

Poll source	Date(s) administered	Sample size	Margin of error	John Kasich (R)	Larry Ealy (D)	Anita Rios (G)	Undecided
SurveyUSA	April 24–28, 2014	618	± 4%	50%	25%	7%	18%

Poll source	Date(s) administered	Sample size	Margin of error	John Kasich (R)	Dennis Kucinich (D)	Other	Undecided
Public Policy Polling	June 21–24, 2012	673	± 3.8%	45%	35%	—	20%

Poll source	Date(s) administered	Sample size	Margin of error	John Kasich (R)	Tim Ryan (D)	Other	Undecided
Quinnipiac	February 21–26, 2013	1,011	± 3.1%	44%	36%	1%	19%
Public Policy Polling	June 21–24, 2012	673	± 3.8%	41%	33%	—	26%
Public Policy Polling	May 3–6, 2012	875	± 3.3%	40%	41%	—	19%

Poll source	Date(s) administered	Sample size	Margin of error	John Kasich (R)	Ted Strickland (D)	Other	Undecided
Public Policy Polling	June 21–24, 2012	673	± 3.8%	44%	42%	—	14%
Public Policy Polling	May 3–6, 2012	875	± 3.3%	40%	47%	—	12%
Public Policy Polling	January 28–29, 2012	820	± 3.4%	36%	56%	—	8%

Poll source	Date(s) administered	Sample size	Margin of error	John Kasich (R)	Betty Sutton (D)	Other	Undecided
Quinnipiac	February 21–26, 2013	1,011	± 3.1%	45%	38%	1%	16%

- ^ Polling for the Ohio Democratic Party

=== Results ===
State Senate district results

Ohio gubernatorial election, 2014
Party	Candidate	Votes	%	±%
Republican	John Kasich (incumbent); Mary Taylor (incumbent)	1,944,848	63.64%	+14.60%
Democratic	Ed FitzGerald; Sharen Neuhardt	1,009,359	33.03%	−14.01%
Green	Anita Rios; Bob Fitrakis	101,706	3.33%	+1.81%
Total votes		3,055,913	100.00%	N/A
Republican hold				

==== By county ====
County	John Kasich Republican		Ed Fitzgerald Democratic		Anita Rios Green		Margin		Total votes cast
County	#	%	#	%	#	%	#	%	Total votes cast
Adams	4,499	73.75%	1,462	23.97%	139	2.28%	3,037	49.78%	6,100
Allen	19,587	71.86%	7,091	26.01%	581	2.13%	12,496	45.85%	27,259
Ashland	11,267	75.88%	3,177	21.40%	405	2.72%	8,090	54.48%	14,849
Ashtabula	15,390	58.22%	10,082	38.14%	964	3.64%	5,308	20.08%	26,436
Athens	5,589	38.79%	7,855	54.52%	964	6.69%	-2,266	-15.73%	14,408
Auglaize	11,031	81.13%	2,287	16.82%	279	2.05%	8,744	64.31%	13,597
Belmont	10,205	53.31%	8,410	43.93%	529	2.76%	1,795	9.38%	19,144
Brown	8,550	74.05%	2,731	23.65%	266	2.30%	5,819	50.40%	11,547
Butler	62,438	72.51%	21,551	25.03%	2,117	2.46%	40,887	47.48%	86,106
Carroll	5,401	69.22%	2,137	27.39%	265	3.39%	3,264	41.83%	7,803
Champaign	8,522	74.52%	2,575	22.52%	339	2.96%	5,947	52.00%	11,436
Clark	25,640	66.57%	11,957	31.05%	917	2.38%	13,683	35.52%	38,514
Clermont	39,395	77.92%	9,647	19.08%	1,514	3.00%	29,748	58.84%	50,556
Clinton	7,573	79.08%	1,752	18.30%	251	2.62%	5,821	60.78%	9,576
Columbiana	18,895	70.18%	7,217	26.80%	813	3.02%	11,678	43.38%	26,925
Coshocton	6,365	70.05%	2,489	27.39%	233	2.56%	3,876	42.66%	9,087
Crawford	8,870	74.54%	2,778	23.34%	252	2.12%	6,092	51.20%	11,900
Cuyahoga	172,319	51.17%	149,986	44.54%	14,464	4.29%	22,333	6.63%	336,769
Darke	12,213	83.20%	2,220	15.12%	246	1.68%	9,993	68.08%	14,679
Defiance	7,747	71.38%	2,831	26.08%	275	2.54%	4,916	45.30%	10,853
Delaware	44,685	76.10%	12,355	21.04%	1,676	2.86%	32,330	55.06%	58,716
Erie	13,944	60.27%	8,512	36.79%	681	2.94%	5,432	23.48%	23,137
Fairfield	28,614	70.56%	10,851	26.76%	1,089	2.68%	17,763	43.80%	40,554
Fayette	4,821	76.48%	1,339	21.24%	144	2.28%	3,482	55.24%	6,304
Franklin	161,747	55.61%	115,871	39.84%	13,245	4.55%	45,876	15.77%	290,863
Fulton	7,845	72.38%	2,718	25.08%	275	2.54%	5,127	47.30%	10,838
Gallia	5,047	68.71%	2,088	28.43%	210	2.86%	2,959	40.28%	7,345
Geauga	23,072	75.11%	6,579	21.42%	1,065	3.47%	16,493	53.69%	30,716
Greene	35,734	73.08%	11,811	24.15%	1,354	2.77%	23,923	48.93%	48,899
Guernsey	6,794	66.67%	3,111	30.53%	286	2.80%	3,683	36.14%	10,191
Hamilton	142,066	60.12%	85,535	36.20%	8,684	3.68%	56,531	23.92%	236,285
Hancock	15,743	79.98%	3,451	17.53%	489	2.49%	12,292	62.45%	19,683
Hardin	4,806	73.93%	1,544	23.75%	151	2.32%	3,262	50.18%	6,501
Harrison	2,875	61.99%	1,599	34.48%	164	3.53%	1,276	27.51%	4,638
Henry	5,948	75.67%	1,717	21.84%	195	2.49%	4,231	53.83%	7,860
Highland	7,718	77.15%	2,078	20.77%	208	2.08%	5,640	56.38%	10,004
Hocking	4,894	64.79%	2,418	32.01%	242	3.20%	2,476	32.78%	7,554
Holmes	5,398	82.88%	943	14.48%	172	2.64%	4,455	68.40%	6,513
Huron	9,776	69.72%	3,838	27.37%	407	2.91%	5,938	42.35%	14,021
Jackson	4,579	65.23%	2,217	31.58%	224	3.19%	2,362	33.65%	7,020
Jefferson	10,974	57.90%	7,342	38.74%	636	3.36%	3,632	19.16%	18,952
Knox	12,747	74.28%	3,840	22.38%	574	3.34%	8,907	51.90%	17,161
Lake	46,189	67.95%	19,698	28.98%	2,083	3.07%	26,491	38.97%	67,970
Lawrence	9,120	63.57%	4,817	33.58%	409	2.85%	4,303	29.99%	14,346
Licking	33,620	71.33%	11,999	25.46%	1,516	3.21%	21,621	45.87%	47,135
Logan	10,118	79.11%	2,343	18.32%	328	2.57%	7,775	60.79%	12,789
Lorain	47,256	60.72%	27,859	35.80%	2,705	3.48%	19,397	24.92%	77,820
Lucas	53,808	50.75%	48,179	45.45%	4,029	3.80%	5,629	5.30%	106,016
Madison	7,492	73.73%	2,348	23.11%	322	3.16%	5,144	50.62%	10,162
Mahoning	35,578	53.68%	28,376	42.81%	2,322	3.51%	7,202	10.87%	66,276
Marion	11,129	70.45%	4,147	26.25%	522	3.30%	6,982	44.20%	15,798
Medina	34,541	71.76%	12,117	25.17%	1,479	3.07%	22,424	46.59%	48,137
Meigs	3,612	63.75%	1,811	31.96%	243	4.29%	1,801	31.79%	5,666
Mercer	10,155	82.88%	1,914	15.62%	184	1.50%	8,241	67.26%	12,253
Miami	24,735	79.60%	5,693	18.32%	646	2.08%	19,042	61.28%	31,074
Monroe	2,197	44.25%	2,577	51.90%	191	3.85%	-380	-7.65%	4,965
Montgomery	90,683	62.18%	51,664	35.43%	3,483	2.39%	39,019	26.75%	145,830
Morgan	2,579	66.28%	1,189	30.56%	123	3.16%	1,390	35.72%	3,891
Morrow	7,168	73.54%	2,270	23.29%	309	3.17%	4,898	50.25%	9,747
Muskingum	14,658	70.58%	5,482	26.40%	628	3.02%	9,176	44.18%	20,768
Noble	2,331	61.62%	1,319	34.87%	133	3.51%	1,012	26.75%	3,783
Ottawa	9,432	63.44%	4,938	33.21%	497	3.35%	4,494	30.23%	14,867
Paulding	3,850	67.84%	1,638	28.86%	187	3.30%	2,212	38.98%	5,675
Perry	5,840	65.63%	2,788	31.33%	271	3.04%	3,052	34.30%	8,899
Pickaway	9,964	74.68%	3,058	22.92%	321	2.40%	6,906	51.76%	13,343
Pike	4,367	60.84%	2,649	36.90%	162	2.26%	1,718	23.94%	7,178
Portage	25,432	62.36%	13,545	33.21%	1,806	4.43%	11,887	29.15%	40,783
Preble	9,056	78.93%	2,155	18.78%	262	2.29%	6,901	60.15%	11,473
Putnam	8,808	80.02%	2,009	18.25%	190	1.73%	6,799	61.77%	11,007
Richland	23,122	70.30%	9,039	27.48%	729	2.22%	14,083	42.82%	32,890
Ross	10,855	65.43%	5,248	31.63%	488	2.94%	5,607	33.80%	16,591
Sandusky	11,027	66.75%	4,933	29.86%	560	3.39%	6,094	36.89%	16,520
Scioto	9,864	54.70%	7,617	42.24%	553	3.06%	2,247	12.46%	18,034
Seneca	9,662	70.13%	3,722	27.01%	394	2.86%	5,940	43.12%	13,778
Shelby	11,200	80.51%	2,420	17.40%	291	2.09%	8,780	63.11%	13,911
Stark	67,948	66.99%	30,705	30.27%	2,779	2.74%	37,243	36.72%	101,432
Summit	79,004	58.65%	50,865	37.76%	4,825	3.59%	28,139	20.89%	134,694
Trumbull	31,382	55.12%	23,536	41.34%	2,018	3.54%	7,846	13.78%	56,936
Tuscarawas	15,361	65.03%	7,618	32.25%	642	2.72%	7,743	32.78%	23,621
Union	10,987	78.31%	2,598	18.52%	445	3.17%	8,389	59.79%	14,030
Van Wert	5,353	76.11%	1,512	21.50%	168	2.39%	3,841	54.61%	7,033
Vinton	1,993	62.38%	1,079	33.77%	123	3.85%	914	28.61%	3,195
Warren	46,167	78.42%	11,427	19.41%	1,279	2.17%	34,740	59.01%	58,873
Washington	12,152	66.27%	5,659	30.86%	525	2.87%	6,493	35.41%	18,336
Wayne	19,962	74.65%	5,951	22.25%	828	3.10%	14,011	52.40%	26,741
Williams	7,066	73.49%	2,245	23.35%	304	3.16%	4,821	50.14%	9,615
Wood	22,296	63.63%	11,482	32.77%	1,264	3.60%	10,814	30.86%	35,042
Wyandot	4,406	77.42%	1,129	19.84%	156	2.74%	3,277	57.58%	5,691
Totals	1,944,848	63.64%	1,009,359	33.03%	101,706	3.33%	935,489	30.61%	3,055,913

Counties that flipped from Democratic to Republican

- Ashtabula (largest city: Ashtabula)
- Belmont (largest city: Martins Ferry)
- Cuyahoga (largest city: Cleveland)
- Erie (largest city: Sandusky)
- Franklin (largest city: Columbus)
- Harrison (largest city: Cadiz)
- Hocking (largest city: Logan)
- Jackson (largest city: Jackson)
- Jefferson (largest city: Steubenville)
- Lawrence (largest city: Ironton)
- Lorain (largest municipality: Lorain)
- Lucas (largest city: Toledo)
- Mahoning (largest municipality: Youngstown)
- Meigs (largest city: Middleport)
- Montgomery (largest city: Dayton)
- Noble (largest city: Caldwell)
- Ottawa (largest city: Port Clinton)
- Pike (largest city: Waverly)
- Ross (largest city: Chillicothe)
- Scioto (largest city: Portsmouth)
- Summit (largest city: Akron)
- Trumbull (largest city: Warren)
- Vinton (largest city: McArthur)
- Washington (largest city: Marietta)
- Wood (largest city: Bowling Green)

==== By congressional district ====
Kasich won 14 of 16 congressional districts, including two that voted for Democrats.

District	Kasich	FitzGerald	Representative
1st	65%	32%	Steve Chabot
2nd	69%	30%	Brad Wenstrup
3rd	47%	49%	Joyce Beatty
4th	71%	26%	Jim Jordan
5th	69%	28%	Bob Latta
6th	63%	34%	Bill Johnson
7th	70%	27%	Bob Gibbs
8th	74%	24%	John Boehner
9th	52%	44%	Marcy Kaptur
10th	65%	32%	Mike Turner
11th	35%	61%	Marcia Fudge
12th	70%	27%	Pat Tiberi
13th	53%	43%	Tim Ryan
14th	68%	29%	David Joyce
15th	66%	30%	Steve Stivers
16th	70%	27%	Jim Renacci
