= Armond Budish =

American politician (born 1953)

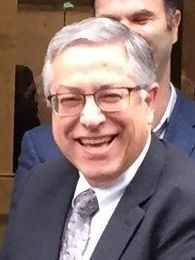

2nd Executive of Cuyahoga County
- In office January 1, 2015 – December 31, 2022
- Preceded by: Ed FitzGerald
- Succeeded by: Chris Ronayne

100th Speaker of the Ohio House of Representatives
- In office January 5, 2009 – January 3, 2011
- Preceded by: Jon Husted
- Succeeded by: William G. Batchelder

Minority Leader of the Ohio House of Representatives
- In office January 3, 2011 – June 1, 2013
- Preceded by: William G. Batchelder
- Succeeded by: Tracy Maxwell Heard

Member of the Ohio House of Representatives from the 8th district
- In office January 2, 2007 – December 31, 2014
- Preceded by: Lance Mason
- Succeeded by: Kent Smith

Personal details
- Born: June 2, 1953 (age 73) Cleveland, Ohio, U.S.
- Party: Democratic
- Education: Swarthmore College (BA); New York University (JD)
- Profession: Lawyer; TV host

Armond D. Budish (/ˈbjuːdɪʃ/ BYOO-dish; born June 2, 1953) is an American politician, lawyer, and television host who served as Cuyahoga County Executive for two terms from 2015 to 2022. A member of the Democratic Party, he was a four-term Ohio State Representative from the 8th district, and served as Speaker of the House from 2009 to 2011. He was the first Jewish representative to hold that office. He was re-elected to the House in 2010 and 2012, and thereafter was term-limited.

Before his entry into politics in 2006, he was an attorney specializing in consumer and elder law with Budish, Solomon, Steiner & Peck, and hosted a weekly Sunday morning senior issues TV program titled Golden Opportunities on Cleveland NBC affiliate WKYC channel 3. He resides in Beachwood, Ohio.

== Early life ==
Budish was born in Cleveland in 1953. His father was an electrical engineer, and his mother was a homemaker who later became a teacher. He grew up in South Euclid before moving to Beachwood when he was in seventh grade. He was elected president of the Beachwood High School senior class of 1971, but moved to Bethesda, Maryland, halfway through the school year after his father got a new job.

== Career ==
Budish received his bachelor's degree (cum laude) in 1974 from Swarthmore College in Swarthmore, Pennsylvania, where he was a political science major. He then went on to complete a Juris Doctor degree from New York University School of Law. In 1993, he founded the law firm Budish, Solomon, Steiner, & Peck, of which he continues to be a partner. During that time Budish became nationally recognized for his work in the field of consumer law, estate planning, and elder law. He was elected to Cuyahoga County Executive for the first time in November 2014, and was reelected to the post in 2018.

== Ohio House of Representatives ==
In 2006, after both of his sons left for college, he made the decision to run for public office, and was elected to the Ohio House of Representatives from the 8th District, which includes parts of Cleveland, Ohio, and some of the city's eastern neighbors. He was re-elected in 2008 and was chosen Speaker of the House by his peers in January 2009, becoming the first Jewish Speaker of the Ohio House of Representatives. His main focus in the 128th General Assembly was job creation in the difficult economic conditions of 2009. To that end, he created several new committees, including Economic Development and Housing & Urban Revitalization.

Budish faced mounting criticism from opponents in February 2010 for not allowing the National Right to Life Oratory Contest winner to receive an honorary resolution on the House floor. However, he soon reversed his decision and allowed for the award to be given. He also was criticized for colluding with progressive political action committees in the 2010 election cycle. Charges on the matter were later dropped.

With the Republicans regaining control of the State House in 2010, Armond Budish lost a second term as House Speaker, and was replaced by William G. Batchelder. He was chosen to remain as Minority Leader with the approval of his colleagues. On January 3, 2011 Budish was sworn in as minority leader, and pledged cooperation with Republicans. He stated he would be available "to help you and to help your colleagues forge the essential, equitable, bipartisan solutions to the economic and social problems Ohio faces." However, Budish has also acknowledged that he believes that the Republican Party is motivated to annihilate the Democratic voting base, and is out to make Ohio a one party state. Along with his duties as leader, Budish also serves the ranking member of the Rules and Reference Committee. Budish is also a member of the Ohio Arts Council; a member of the Joint Legislative Ethics Committee; the Ohio Legislative Service Commission; the Program Committee of Ohio Government Telecommunications; and the Legislative Task Force on Redistricting, Reapportionment, and Demographic Research.

Budish won a final term in 2012, defeating Republican Tony Hocevar with 83% of the vote.

== Policies, positions and initiatives ==
Fiscal issues

He has called the 2012–2013 Kasich budget proposal "horrific" and said they will have a "terrible" impact on all Ohioans. He has said a proposed $1 billion cut in local government funds will mean local officials will have to slash their budgets and cut police and firefighters. He called a proposed $3 billion reduction in basic funding for schools "horrific" and predicted it would force districts to cut teacher salaries and positions and increase the size of some classes to 50 students or more.

He also pointed to developments in Florida, where newly elected Gov. Rick Scott fired the president of a similar public-private entity and has proposed to consolidate economic development operations into a reinstated Department of Commerce.

Budish has also remained vocal on an initiative to move a Cuyahoga County mental health facility to Northfield, Ohio. "I think it's a disservice to the families to build it anywhere else -- 90 percent of the families are Cleveland families," he said. "You can't just go back and forth on a whim."

Collective bargaining

A leader in the fight against a bill that eliminated portions of collective bargaining for public employees, Budish had promised to "fight like hell" against the passage of the measure. He also has come out against a measure to limit or eliminate overtime pay for any employee of a private company in Ohio. Budish, along with fellow Democrats delivered over 65,000 signed signatures against the bill to the committee that was hearing the legislation. The bill went on to pass the House, and was concurred upon in the Senate. Budish stated it was an attack on something that helped to raise up the working poor over a period of thirty years.

In August 2011, Kasich and Republican leaders, fearing that the repeal effort could potential overturn the bill, sought to bring organized labor leaders together. However, those against the measures opted to not meet with the Governor unless the entire legislation was repealed. As a result, Budish drafted legislation that would effectively overturn Senate Bill 5. He has urged on a vote from Speaker of the House William G. Batchelder to repeal the bill.

Social issues

Demonstrating outrage over a measure that looks to require a photo ID to vote, Budish has called it a modern-day poll tax that will unfairly harm impoverished, minority and handicapped voters at the polls. He has called the bill "partisan attack on the right to vote." In 2019, Budish proposed a plan that would reduce the Cuyahoga County jail's population and the dedication of more resources for the increasing number of children in county custody. The budget includes $1 million for bail reform initiatives and money for additional corrections officers.

Education

Budish has also opposed an initiative to allow for the return of five calamity days to schools, mostly due to an unfunded mandate that requires public schools to provide transportation to non-public schools on said days.

== Corruption investigation ==
On February 14, 2019, FBI agents and other law enforcement officials raided Budish's downtown Cleveland office, seizing documents and computer hard drives as part of a broader investigation into alleged corruption in Cuyahoga County government.

== See also ==
- List of speakers of the Ohio House of Representatives

Political offices
Preceded by Jon Husted	Speaker of the Ohio House of Representatives; 2009–2011	Succeeded by William G. Batchelder
Preceded by Ed FitzGerald	County Executive of Cuyahoga County, Ohio; 2015–2022	Succeeded by Chris Ronayne
