= Highland Hills, Ohio =

- Village
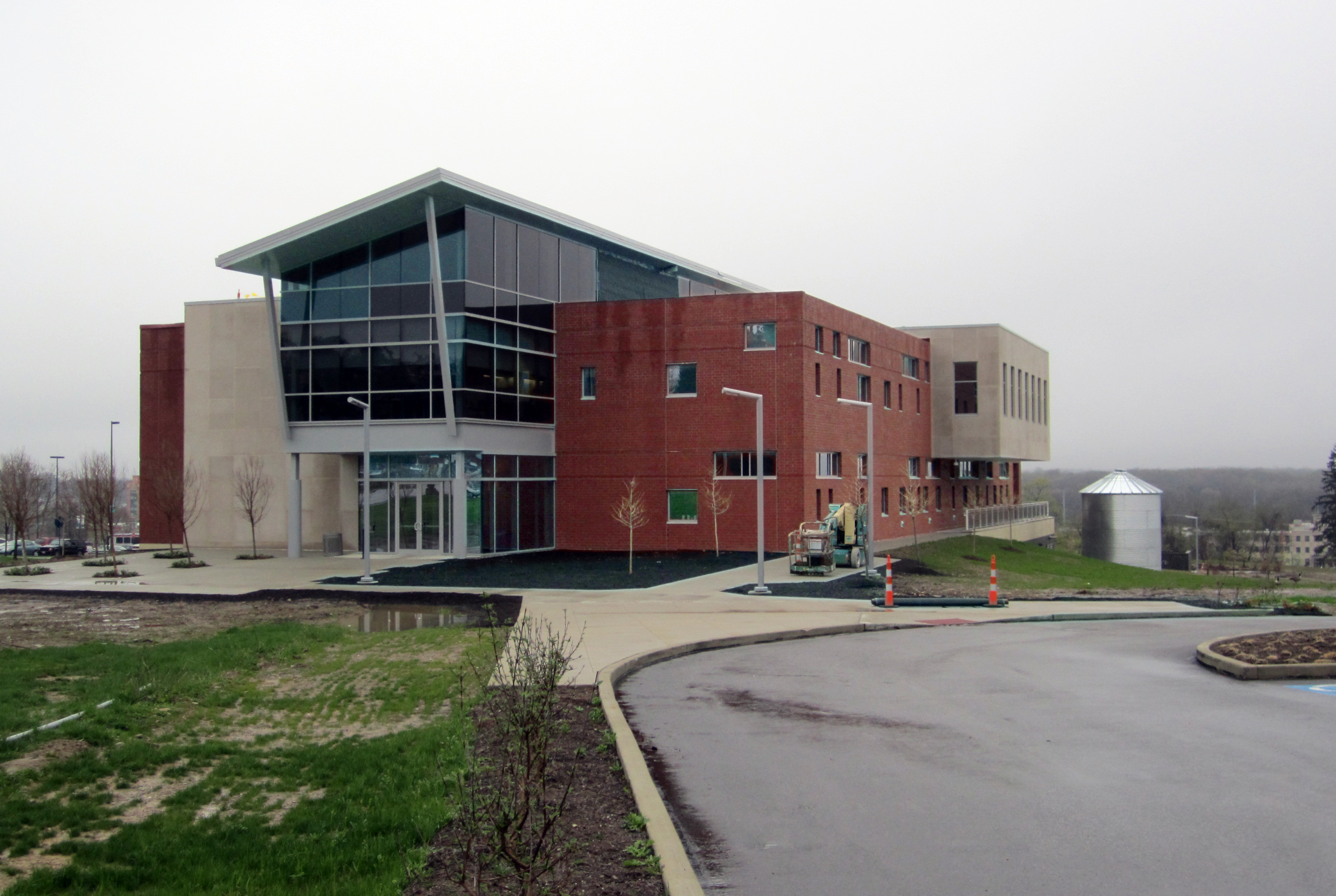
- Cuyahoga Community College campus

- Flag Seal
- Interactive map of Highland Hills, Ohio
- Location within Ohio Location within the United States
- Coordinates: 41°26′49″N 81°31′28″W
- Country: United States
- State: Ohio
- County: Cuyahoga

Government
  - Mayor: Michael Booker (D)

Area
  - Total: 1.97 sq mi (5.09 km^{2})
  - Land: 1.96 sq mi (5.07 km^{2})
  - Water: 0.0077 sq mi (0.02 km^{2})
- Elevation: 1,096 ft (334 m)

Population (2020)
  - Total: 662
  - Estimate (2023): 700
  - Density: 338.0/sq mi (130.52/km^{2})
- Time zone: UTC-5 (Eastern (EST))
  - Summer (DST): UTC-4 (EDT)
- ZIP codes: 44122, 44128
- Area code: 216
- FIPS code: 39-35255
- GNIS feature ID: 1085667
- Website: www.vhhohio.org

Highland Hills is a village in Cuyahoga County, Ohio, United States. The population was 662 at the 2020 census. A suburb of Cleveland, it was formally incorporated in 1990.

== Geography ==
Highland Hills is located at 41°26′49″N 81°31′28″W (41.446854, -81.524448).

According to the United States Census Bureau, the village has a total area of 1.97 square miles (5.10 km^{2}), of which 1.96 square miles (5.08 km^{2}) is land and 0.01 square miles (0.03 km^{2}) is water.

== Demographics ==
Historical population
Census	Pop.	Note	%±
2000	1,618		—
2010	1,130		−30.2%
2020	662		−41.4%
2023 (est.)	700	▲	5.7%
U.S. Decennial Census

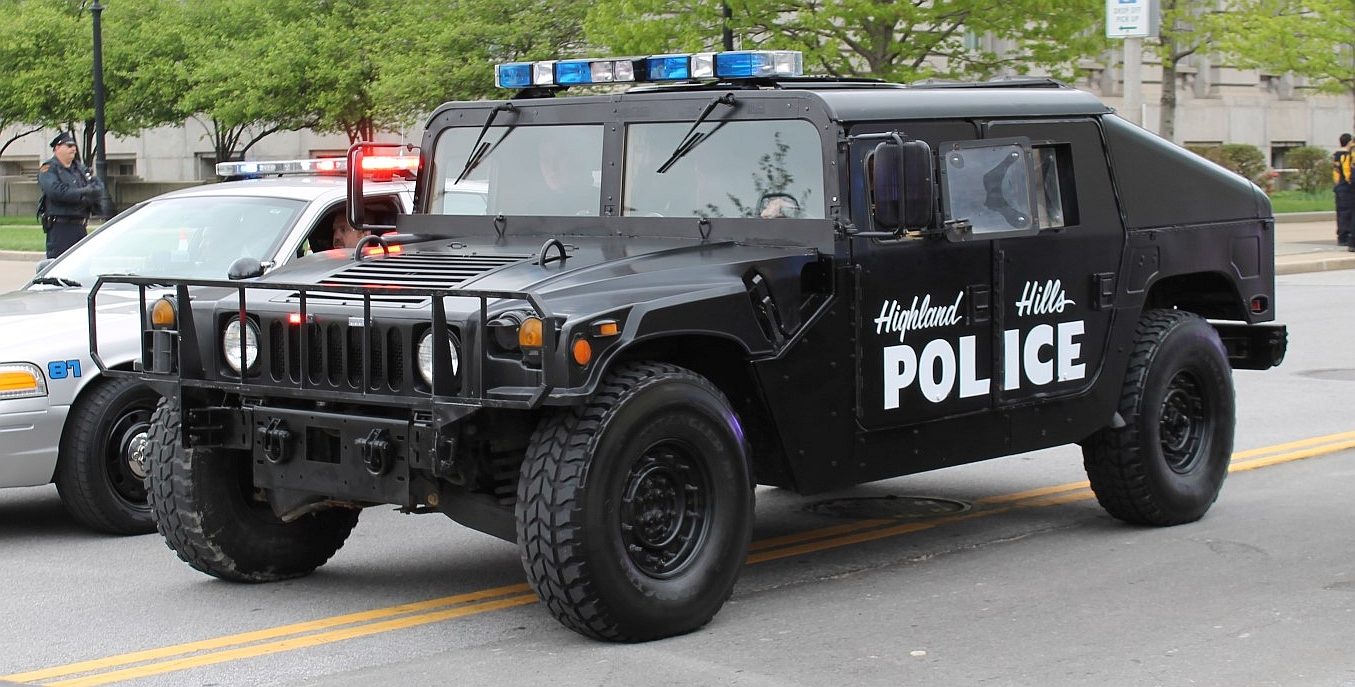
Police vehicle

=== 2020 census ===
Highland Hills village, Ohio – Racial and ethnic composition Note: the US Census treats Hispanic/Latino as an ethnic category. This table excludes Latinos from the racial categories and assigns them to a separate category. Hispanics/Latinos may be of any race.
Race / Ethnicity (NH = Non-Hispanic)	Pop 2000	Pop 2010	Pop 2020	% 2000	% 2010	% 2020
White alone (NH)	483	245	73	29.85%	21.68%	11.03%
Black or African American alone (NH)	1,049	836	561	64.83%	73.98%	84.74%
Native American or Alaska Native alone (NH)	1	1	0	0.06%	0.09%	0.00%
Asian alone (NH)	15	3	1	0.93%	0.27%	0.15%
Native Hawaiian or Pacific Islander alone (NH)	0	0	0	0.00%	0.00%	0.00%
Other race alone (NH)	1	0	3	0.06%	0.00%	0.45%
Mixed race or Multiracial (NH)	37	15	10	2.29%	1.33%	1.51%
Hispanic or Latino (any race)	32	30	14	1.98%	2.65%	2.11%
Total	1,618	1,130	662	100.00%	100.00%	100.00%

=== 2010 census ===
As of the census of 2010, there were 1,130 people, 268 households, and 115 families living in the village. The population density was 576.5 inhabitants per square mile (222.6/km^{2}). There were 315 housing units at an average density of 160.7 per square mile (62.0/km^{2}). The racial makeup of the village was 23.5% White, 74.4% African American, 0.1% Native American, 0.3% Asian, 0.3% from other races, and 1.5% from two or more races. Hispanic or Latino of any race were 2.7% of the population.

There were 268 households, of which 19.8% had children under the age of 18 living with them, 16.0% were married couples living together, 23.5% had a female householder with no husband present, 3.4% had a male householder with no wife present, and 57.1% were non-families. 52.6% of all households were made up of individuals, and 30.6% had someone living alone who was 65 years of age or older. The average household size was 1.79 and the average family size was 2.65.

The median age in the village was 33 years. 23.1% of residents were under the age of 18; 17% were between the ages of 18 and 24; 22.8% were from 25 to 44; 22.2% were from 45 to 64; and 14.8% were 65 years of age or older. The gender makeup of the village was 67.3% male and 32.7% female.

=== 2000 census ===
As of the census of 2000, there were 1,618 people, 272 households, and 128 families living in the village. The population density was 818.2 inhabitants per square mile (315.9/km^{2}). There were 309 housing units at an average density of 156.3 per square mile (60.3/km^{2}). The racial makeup of the village was 30.47% White, 65.08% African American, 0.06% Native American, 0.93% Asian, 0.99% from other races, and 2.47% from two or more races. Hispanic or Latino of any race were 1.98% of the population.

There were 272 households, out of which 18.0% had children under the age of 18 living with them, 23.5% were married couples living together, 20.6% had a female householder with no husband present, and 52.9% were non-families. 47.8% of all households were made up of individuals, and 8.8% had someone living alone who was 65 years of age or older. The average household size was 1.91 and the average family size was 2.70.

In the village, the population was spread out, with 25.7% under the age of 18, 10.1% from 18 to 24, 26.5% from 25 to 44, 22.6% from 45 to 64, and 15.1% who were 65 years of age or older. The median age was 37 years. For every 100 females there were 213.6 males. For every 100 females age 18 and over, there were 156.8 males.

The median income for a household in the village was $31,731, and the median income for a family was $37,404. Males had a median income of $20,189 versus $38,977 for females. The per capita income for the village was $18,565. About 10.1% of families and 22.9% of the population were below the poverty line, including 24.0% of those under age 18 and 7.9% of those age 65 or over.

== Education ==
The Village of Highland Hills is served by the Warrensville Heights City School District, which has four campuses and an enrollment of approximately 2,500 students.
