= Cuyahoga Land Bank =

The Cuyahoga County Land Reutilization Corporation, commonly known as the Cuyahoga Land Bank, is a quasi-governmental non-profit corporation established in Ohio in 2009. It was established to respond to the effects of the United States housing bubble in Cleveland and surrounding Cuyahoga County, where the housing bubble had a particularly strong impact.

As a land bank, the Cuyahoga Land Bank acquires financially distressed properties, including those which have been foreclosed due to unpaid tax liens or mortgages, rehabilitates or (in most cases) demolishes the structures on the property, and then either sells the properties, or holds them off the market, with the goal of reducing the glut of undervalued properties (and stabilizing surrounding property values) until economic conditions improve. The program was modeled after a similar one in Genesee County, Michigan.

The land bank has acquired thousands of properties from various sellers. In December 2011 the land bank's president, Gus Frangos, said they were receiving about 120 donated properties per month, up from 80 per month the previous year. By December 2012 it had bought more than 800 houses from the United States Department of Housing and Urban Development (HUD) for as little as $100 apiece, before HUD announced that it could no longer afford to do this and would start selling the properties on the open market. HUD reversed that decision in February 2013 after intervention from Ohio's U.S. senator Sherrod Brown. Among the houses bought by the Cuyahoga Land Bank is the home of Ariel Castro; as part of his plea deal in court, he was forced to pay $22,000 to the Land Bank, which would acquire the property and tear down the house. The house will be demolished the week of August 8; the cost of the demolition was donated.
