= Tim McCormack =

American politician

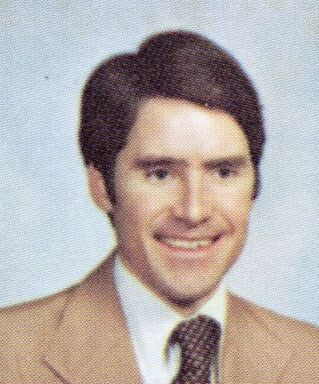

Member of the Ohio Senate from the 31st district
- In office January 3, 1975-December 31, 1982
- Preceded by: Charles Bolton
- Succeeded by: Eugene Branstool

Personal details
- Born: c. 1944
- Party: Democratic

J. Tim McCormack is a politician from Euclid, Ohio. He has served as Commissioner, Auditor, as well as Euclid City Councilman, Ohio House of Representatives, and United States Senate. He is currently a Judge of the Ohio Court of Appeals in the Eighth Appellate District.
