= North Randall, Ohio =

- Village
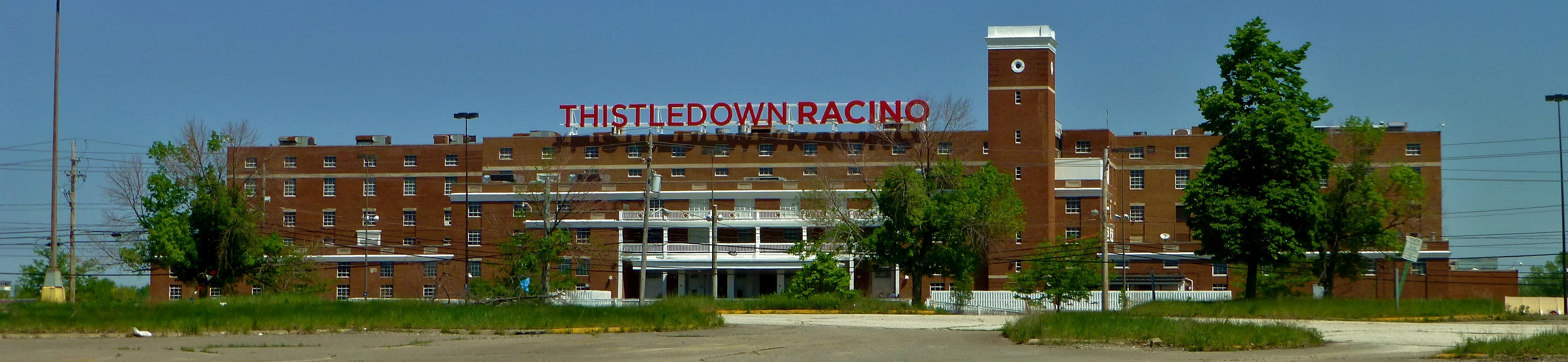
- Thistledown Racino racetrack

- Seal
- Nickname: Randall
- Interactive map of North Randall, Ohio
- Location within Ohio Location within the United States
- Coordinates: 41°25′52″N 81°31′50″W
- Country: United States
- State: Ohio
- County: Cuyahoga

Government
  - Type: Mayor-council
  - Mayor: David Smith (D)

Area
  - Total: 0.78 sq mi (2.02 km^{2})
  - Land: 0.78 sq mi (2.01 km^{2})
  - Water: 0 sq mi (0.00 km^{2})
- Elevation: 1,043 ft (318 m)

Population (2020)
  - Total: 954
  - Density: 1,227.0/sq mi (473.76/km^{2})
- census
- Time zone: UTC-4 (EST)
  - Summer (DST): UTC-4 (EDT)
- Zip code: 44128
- Area code: 216
- FIPS code: 39-56924
- GNIS feature ID: 1065160
- Website: http://www.northrandall.com

North Randall is a village in Cuyahoga County, Ohio, United States. The population was 954 at the 2020 census. A suburb of Cleveland, it is a part of the Cleveland metropolitan area.

== History ==
Settlement at North Randall began in earnest in the 1850s when the Cleveland & Mahoning Railroad was extended to that point. North Randall was incorporated as a village in 1908.

== Geography ==
North Randall is located at 41°25′52″N 81°31′50″W (44.431203, -81.530582).

According to the United States Census Bureau, the village has a total area of 0.77 square miles (1.99 km^{2}), all land.

== Demographics ==
Historical population
Census	Pop.	Note	%±
1910	62		—
1920	652		951.6%
1930	107		−83.6%
1940	92		−14.0%
1950	178		93.5%
1960	688		286.5%
1970	1,212		76.2%
1980	1,054		−13.0%
1990	977		−7.3%
2000	906		−7.3%
2010	1,027		13.4%
2020	954		−7.1%
U.S. Decennial Census

North Randall village, Ohio – Racial and ethnic composition Note: the US Census treats Hispanic/Latino as an ethnic category. This table excludes Latinos from the racial categories and assigns them to a separate category. Hispanics/Latinos may be of any race.
Race / Ethnicity (NH = Non-Hispanic)	Pop 2000	Pop 2010	Pop 2020	% 2000	% 2010	% 2020
White alone (NH)	159	102	73	17.55%	9.93%	7.65%
Black or African American alone (NH)	645	885	812	71.19%	86.17%	85.12%
Native American or Alaska Native alone (NH)	2	6	2	0.22%	0.58%	0.21%
Asian alone (NH)	9	13	9	0.99%	1.27%	0.94%
Native Hawaiian or Pacific Islander alone (NH)	0	0	0	0.00%	0.00%	0.00%
Other race alone (NH)	0	2	5	0.00%	0.19%	0.52%
Mixed race or Multiracial (NH)	25	12	22	2.76%	1.17%	2.31%
Hispanic or Latino (any race)	66	7	31	7.28%	0.68%	3.25%
Total	906	1,027	954	100.00%	100.00%	100.00%

=== 2010 census ===
As of the census of 2010, there were 1,027 people, 462 households, and 209 families living in the village. The population density was 1,333.8 inhabitants per square mile (515.0/km^{2}). There were 571 housing units at an average density of 741.6 per square mile (286.3/km^{2}). The racial makeup of the village was 10.2% White, 86.3% African American, 0.9% Native American, 1.3% Asian, 0.2% from other races, and 1.2% from two or more races. Hispanic or Latino of any race were 0.7% of the population.

There were 462 households, of which 21.4% had children under the age of 18 living with them, 19.0% were married couples living together, 20.8% had a female householder with no husband present, 5.4% had a male householder with no wife present, and 54.8% were non-families. 51.1% of all households were made up of individuals, and 14.5% had someone living alone who was 65 years of age or older. The average household size was 1.84 and the average family size was 2.69.

The median age in the village was 51.2 years. 15.2% of residents were under the age of 18; 6.8% were between the ages of 18 and 24; 19.8% were from 25 to 44; 31% were from 45 to 64; and 27.4% were 65 years of age or older. The gender makeup of the village was 42.8% male and 57.2% female.

=== 2000 census ===
As of the census of 2000, there were 906 people, 465 households, and 211 families living in the village. The population density was 1,158.8 inhabitants per square mile (447.4/km^{2}). There were 490 housing units at an average density of 626.7 per square mile (242.0/km^{2}). The racial makeup of the village was 21.08% White, 71.74% Black or African American, 0.33% Native American, 0.99% Asian, 2.98% from other races, and 2.87% from two or more races. Hispanic or Latino of any race were 7.28% of the population.

There were 465 households, out of which 20.4% had children under the age of 18 living with them, 22.6% were married couples living together, 18.7% had a female householder with no husband present, and 54.6% were non-families. 51.0% of all households were made up of individuals, and 13.8% had someone living alone who was 65 years of age or older. The average household size was 1.80 and the average family size was 2.62.

In the village, the population was spread out, with 16.3% under the age of 18, 10.4% from 18 to 24, 32.1% from 25 to 44, 24.7% from 45 to 64, and 16.4% who were 65 years of age or older. The median age was 40 years. For every 100 females there were 94.8 males. For every 100 females age 18 and over, there were 94.9 males.

The median income for a household in the village was $28,235, and the median income for a family was $38,580. Males had a median income of $31,154 versus $25,417 for females. The per capita income for the village was $20,938. About 5.6% of families and 11.4% of the population were below the poverty line, including 9.3% of those under age 18 and 7.3% of those age 65 or over.

== Economy ==
Randall Park Mall opened in 1976 and closed in 2009. Amazon built a new distribution center on the site in 2018.

== Education ==
The Village of North Randall is served by the Warrensville Heights City School District, which has six campuses and an enrollment of approximately 2,500 students.
