= Ed FitzGerald =

American politician (born 1968)

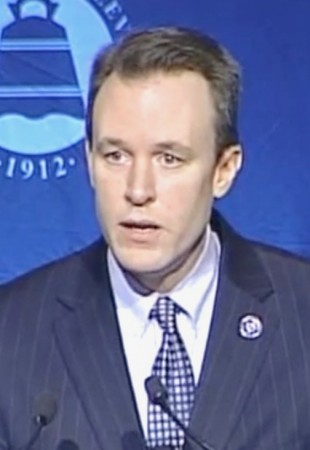
- FitzGerald in 2013

1st Executive of Cuyahoga County
- In office January 9, 2011 – January 1, 2015
- Preceded by: Position established
- Succeeded by: Armond Budish

Mayor of Lakewood, Ohio
- In office 2008–2011
- Preceded by: Thomas George
- Succeeded by: Michael Summers

Personal details
- Born: Edward FitzGerald; July 10, 1968 (age 58)
- Party: Democratic
- Spouse: Shannon FitzGerald
- Children: 4
- Education: Indiana University, Bloomington (attended); Ohio State University (BA); Cleveland State University (JD)

Edward FitzGerald (born July 10, 1968) is an American lawyer and politician who served as the first Cuyahoga County Executive from 2011 to 2015. A member of the Democratic Party, he was the Democratic nominee in the 2014 Ohio gubernatorial election and a candidate for Ohio's 7th congressional district in the 2026 midterms. FitzGerald previously served as mayor and councilman of Lakewood, Ohio, and worked as an assistant Cuyahoga County prosecutor and Federal Bureau of Investigation special agent.

== Early life and education ==
FitzGerald grew up in Indiana and graduated from high school there. He attended Indiana University Bloomington and later transferred to Ohio State University, where he graduated with a bachelor's degree in 1990. He obtained a Juris Doctor degree from Cleveland–Marshall College of Law at Cleveland State University in 1993. During this time, FitzGerald worked as a staff assistant for former U.S. Representative Edward F. Feighan and also served on the staff of Indiana secretary of state Evan Bayh.

== Career ==
In 1995, FitzGerald was commissioned as a special agent with the Federal Bureau of Investigation and was assigned to the Organized Crime Task Force in Chicago. He investigated political corruption and mafia influence in Cicero, Illinois. In 1998, FitzGerald returned to the Cleveland area and later joined the Cuyahoga County Prosecutor's office.

In 1999, he was appointed to the city council in Lakewood, Ohio, a position he held for nine years. In 2007, he was elected mayor of Lakewood. FitzGerald's administration focused on a community-policing initiative and recession-based financial issues similar to those faced by local governments throughout the country.

On November 3, 2009, the voters of Cuyahoga County, which includes Cleveland and 59 surrounding suburbs, authorized a new form of county government, in large part because of widespread scandal. During the criminal investigation, FitzGerald was identified by the F.B.I. as P.O. 14 (Public Official number 14), but charges were never brought against FitzGerald. Under the new system, in 2010 FitzGerald defeated ten other candidates to become the first county executive of Cuyahoga County.

Upon assuming office, FitzGerald spearheaded a long list of reforms under the general rubric of "The Western Reserve Plan." Key components were a strict code of ethics monitored by an inspector general, shrinking the size of government, a sheriff community policing unit, the largest college savings program in the nation, the promotion of regional economic and service cooperation strategies, and a significant economic development fund to promote job creation.

=== 2014 Ohio gubernatorial campaign ===
FitzGerald was frequently mentioned as a potential gubernatorial nominee for 2014. In 2012, he gave a videotaped response to Governor John Kasich's speech at the Republican National Committee. In March 2013, he formed an exploratory committee to consider a campaign for governor of Ohio.

On April 24, 2013, he announced his candidacy for governor of Ohio. FitzGerald was endorsed by Senator Sherrod Brown, former Governor Ted Strickland, Congresswoman Marcy Kaptur, Columbus mayor Michael B. Coleman, Cleveland mayor Frank G. Jackson and numerous unions. On May 6, 2014, FitzGerald won the Democratic primary with 83% of the vote.

FitzGerald released a plan for state-funded universal preschool in addition to announcing his support for gay marriage. He criticized Kasich for signing into law income tax cuts that save larger sums of money for wealthier Ohioans than poorer ones, while increasing sales taxes, which tax a larger percentage of income from poorer Ohioans than from wealthier ones. FitzGerald also chided Kasich for a lack of transparency at JobsOhio, the privatized economic development agency that Kasich formed, and for signing into law bills that cut early voting days and limit the distribution of absentee ballot applications.

On November 20, 2013, FitzGerald picked Eric Kearney to be his running mate. On December 10, Kearney stepped down from the ticket due to increasing controversy surrounding back taxes he and his wife owed. FitzGerald later selected Sharen Swartz Neuhardt, an attorney from the Dayton area, to be his running mate.

On August 1, 2014, FitzGerald was asked to explain an October 13, 2012, incident in which he was found in a parking lot at about 4:30 am in a car with a woman, who was not his wife. FitzGerald dismissed the allegations as baseless and "disgusting." It was later verified with the Westlake Police Department that it was indeed Fitzgerald in the vehicle with the woman. It was also learned that FitzGerald did not have a valid driver's license at the time of this incident, and had not had one for approximately ten years. In November 2012, FitzGerald did obtain a permanent driver's license in Ohio.

FitzGerald was defeated by Kasich in the November 4, 2014, election losing 86 of Ohio's 88 counties including his own home county of Cuyahoga. He only received a majority in Athens and Monroe counties.

=== 2026 congressional campaign ===
After stepping away from politics for over a decade, FitzGerald announced that he would challenge incumbent Max Miller in Ohio's 7th congressional district in the 2026 midterms. He was defeated in the primary by Brook Park councilmember Brian Poindexter.

== Electoral history ==
Election results
Year	Office	Election	Subject	Party	Votes	%	Opponent	Party	Votes	%	Opponent	Party	Votes	%	Opponent	Party	Votes	%	
2014	Governor of Ohio	General	Ed FitzGerald	Democratic	1,009,359	33.03%	John Kasich	Republican	1,944,848	63.64%	Anita Rios	Green	101,706	3.3%					
2010	County Executive of Cuyahoga County, Ohio	General	Ed FitzGerald	Democratic	188,474	45.73%	Matt Dolan	Republican	124,719	30.26%	Ken Lanci	Independent	47,110	11.43%	Tim McCormack	Independent	33,760	8.19%	*
2007	Mayor of Lakewood, Ohio	General	Ed FitzGerald	Non-Partisan	6,631	61.27%	Thomas J. George	Non-Partisan	4,192	38.73%									

*Independent candidate Don Scipione received 11,897 votes (2.89%) and Green Party candidate David Ellison received 6,193 votes (1.5%)

== Personal life ==
FitzGerald is the seventh of eight children and is of Irish Catholic ancestry. He and his wife Shannon have been married for twenty one years and are the parents of four children.

Party political offices
Preceded by Ted Strickland	Democratic nominee for Governor of Ohio; 2014	Succeeded by Richard Cordray
