= Brad Sellers =

American basketball player & politician (born 1962)

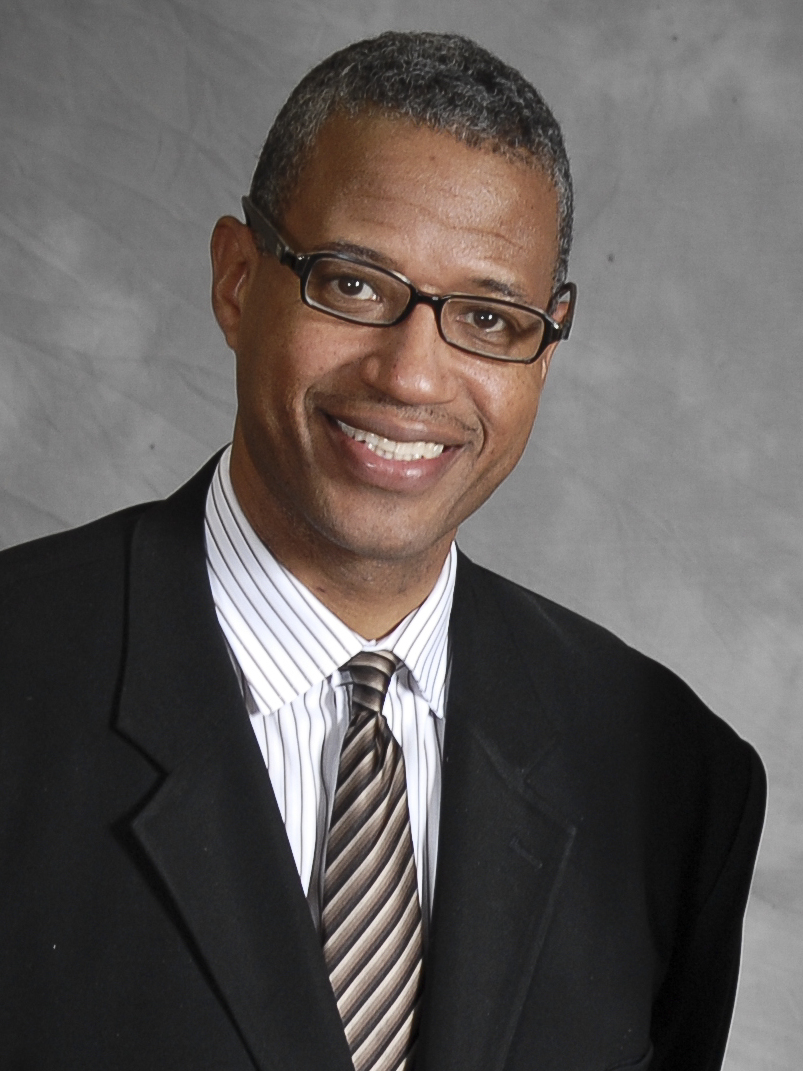

Mayor of Warrensville Heights, Ohio
- Incumbent
- Assumed office January 1, 2012
- Preceded by: Clinton Hill

Personal details
- Born: December 17, 1962 (age 63) Warrensville Heights, Ohio, U.S.
- Party: Democratic
- Basketball career

Personal information
- Listed height: 7 ft 0 in (2.13 m)
- Listed weight: 210 lb (95 kg)

Career information
- High school: Warrensville Heights (Warrensville Heights, Ohio)
- College: Wisconsin (1981–1983); Ohio State (1984–1986)
- NBA draft: 1986: 1st round, 9th overall pick
- Drafted by: Chicago Bulls
- Playing career: 1986–1999
- Position: Power forward / center
- Number: 6, 2, 3, 4

Career history
- 1986–1989: Chicago Bulls
- 1989–1990: Seattle SuperSonics
- 1990: Minnesota Timberwolves
- 1990–1991: Aris
- 1991–1992: Detroit Pistons
- 1992–1993: Minnesota Timberwolves
- 1993–1994: ASA Sceaux
- 1994–1995: Paris Basket Racing
- 1995: Gijón
- 1996–1997: Montpellier Paillade
- 1997–1998: Maccabi Rishon LeZion
- 1998: Olympique Antibes
- 1999: Paris Basket Racing
- 1999: Hyères-Toulon

Career highlights
- Greek League champion (1991); First-team All-Big Ten (1986)
- Stats at NBA.com
- Stats at Basketball Reference

Bradley Donn Sellers (born December 17, 1962) is an American former basketball player, politician, and radio broadcaster.

As a basketball player, Sellers played collegiately from 1981 to 1986 first at Wisconsin before transferring to Ohio State. He then professionally for several teams in the National Basketball Association (NBA) from 1986 to 1994, before going overseas to play for various international teams until retiring in 1999.

As a politician, he is currently serving in his third term as the mayor of his hometown, Warrensville Heights, Ohio.

As a broadcaster, he serves as a postgame radio analyst for the Cleveland Cavaliers AudioVerse (radio network) - a job he has held for over a decade.

== Professional career ==
A 7'0" power forward/center from the University of Wisconsin and Ohio State University, he was selected by the Chicago Bulls in the first round (ninth pick overall) of the 1986 NBA draft.

Sellers was a controversial selection among the Bulls' staff and players. General manager Jerry Krause was attracted to Sellers because of his above-average shooting ability, which was rare in a player of Sellers's size. Michael Jordan and others, however, had wanted Krause to draft Johnny Dawkins, a hard-playing guard from Duke University and a friend of Jordan's.

Sellers eventually became a part-time starter for Chicago, but he never averaged more than 9.5 points or 4.7 rebounds in a season, and, with the emergence of forward Horace Grant during the 1988 NBA playoffs, he began to see his playing time diminish. In 1989, he was traded to the Seattle SuperSonics for the 18th overall pick of that year's NBA draft, which would become point guard B. J. Armstrong. He played sparingly for the Sonics, averaging 4.8 points in 13.0 minutes in 45 before being traded to the Minnesota Timberwolves for Steve Johnson on February 22, 1990, where he finished out the season.

The following season, Sellers played for Aris B.C. in the Greek Basketball League. At the Greek Championships Final in 1991, Sellers made a three-point play (a basket and a foul) that won the game and gave Aris the championship.

Following his stay in Greece, Sellers returned to the NBA and played for the Detroit Pistons and the Timberwolves the next two seasons. From 1993 to 1999, Sellers played in Spain, Israel and France before retiring in 2000 to become community liaison director for his hometown, Warrensville Heights, Ohio.

== Post-playing career ==
Since the 2010-2011 NBA season, Sellers has been a media personality in Cleveland, Ohio as the postgame analyst for Cleveland Cavaliers radio broadcasts.

Sellers was elected mayor of his native Warrensville Heights on November 8, 2011, and sworn in on January 1, 2012. He was re-elected on November 3, 2015, and again in November 2019. Sellers is a member of the Democratic Party.

== Personal life ==
Sellers has four daughters, Sydney, Syarra, Shayla and Shyanne. Syarra played college basketball at Thomas More, Shayla played at Purdue Fort Wayne, and Shyanne played college basketball at Maryland. Shyanne also plays professional basketball for the Jacksonville Waves of the UpShot League.

== Career statistics ==
Legend
| GP | Games played | GS | Games started | MPG | Minutes per game |
| FG% | Field goal percentage | 3P% | 3-point field goal percentage | FT% | Free throw percentage |
| RPG | Rebounds per game | APG | Assists per game | SPG | Steals per game |
| BPG | Blocks per game | PPG | Points per game | **Bold** | Career high |

=== NBA ===
==== Regular season ====
| Year | Team | GP | GS | MPG | FG% | 3P% | FT% | RPG | APG | SPG | BPG | PPG |
|---|---|---|---|---|---|---|---|---|---|---|---|---|
| 1986–87 | Chicago | 80 | 17 | 21.9 | .455 | .200 | .728 | **4.7** | 1.3 | **.6** | **.9** | 8.5 |
| 1987–88 | Chicago | **82** | **76** | **27.0** | .457 | .143 | .790 | 3.0 | **1.7** | .4 | .8 | **9.5** |
| 1988–89 | Chicago | 80 | 25 | 21.7 | **.485** | **.500** | .851 | 2.8 | 1.2 | .4 | **.9** | 6.9 |
| 1989–90 | Seattle | 45 | 0 | 13.0 | .424 | .000 | .803 | 1.6 | .7 | .2 | .4 | 4.8 |
| 1989–90 | Minnesota | 14 | 0 | 8.1 | .339 | .000 | .750 | 1.4 | .1 | .4 | .2 | 3.4 |
| 1991–92 | Detroit | 43 | 1 | 5.4 | .466 | .000 | .769 | 1.0 | .3 | .0 | .2 | 2.4 |
| 1992–93 | Minnesota | 54 | 4 | 9.9 | .377 | .000 | **.949** | 1.5 | .9 | .1 | .2 | 2.5 |
| Career | | 398 | 123 | 18.0 | .452 | .200 | .793 | 2.7 | 1.1 | .3 | .6 | 6.3 |

==== Playoffs ====
| Year | Team | GP | GS | MPG | FG% | 3P% | FT% | RPG | APG | SPG | BPG | PPG |
|---|---|---|---|---|---|---|---|---|---|---|---|---|
| 1987 | Chicago | 3 | 0 | **22.7** | .316 | – | **1.000** | 2.3 | 1.0 | .0 | .3 | **5.0** |
| 1988 | Chicago | 10 | **4** | 14.4 | .349 | – | .882 | 2.1 | .8 | **.2** | .5 | 4.5 |
| 1989 | Chicago | **13** | 0 | 13.6 | .379 | – | .833 | **2.4** | **1.2** | **.2** | .3 | 4.2 |
| 1992 | Detroit | 2 | 0 | 6.5 | **.500** | – | **1.000** | .0 | 1.0 | .0 | **1.0** | 3.0 |
| Career | | 28 | 4 | 14.4 | .363 | – | .882 | 2.1 | 1.0 | .2 | .4 | 4.3 |
