= Warrensville Heights, Ohio =

- City
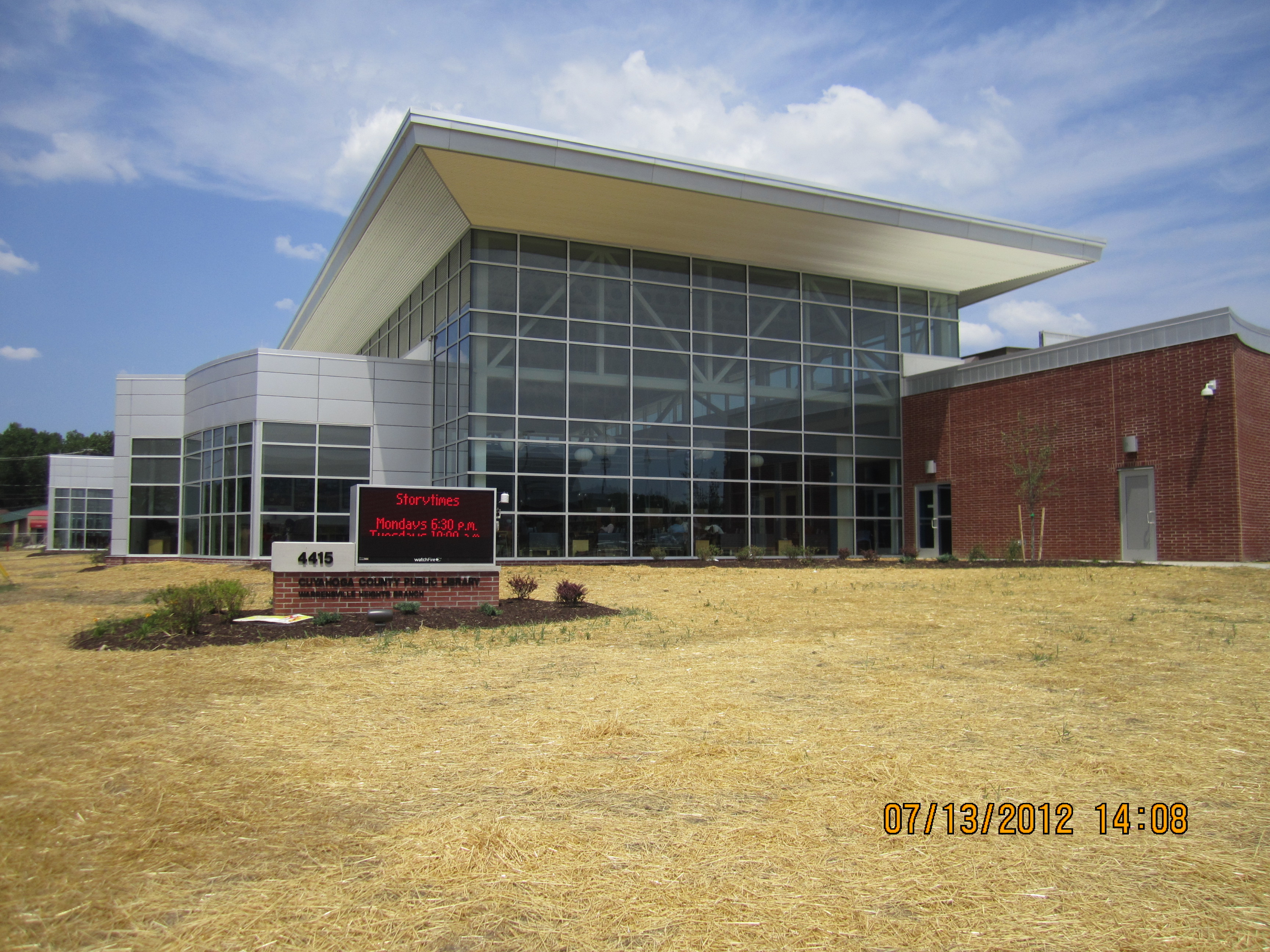
- Warrensville Heights Branch of the Cuyahoga County Public Library

- Flag Seal
- Motto: "The Friendly City"
- Interactive map of Warrensville Heights, Ohio
- Location within Ohio Location within the United States
- Coordinates: 41°26′19″N 81°31′24″W
- Country: United States
- State: Ohio
- County: Cuyahoga
- Village incorporated: 1927
- Incorporated: 1960

Government
  - Type: Mayor-council
  - Mayor: Brad Sellers (D)

Area
  - Total: 4.13 sq mi (10.69 km^{2})
  - Land: 4.12 sq mi (10.68 km^{2})
  - Water: 0.0039 sq mi (0.01 km^{2}) 0.24%
- Elevation: 1,037 ft (316 m)

Population (2020)
  - Total: 13,789
  - Density: 3,344.4/sq mi (1,291.27/km^{2})
- census
- Time zone: UTC-5 (EST)
  - Summer (DST): UTC-4 (EDT)
- Zip code: 44122, 44128
- Area code: 216
- FIPS code: 39-80990
- GNIS feature ID: 1047579
- Website: www.cityofwarrensville.com

Warrensville Heights is a city in Cuyahoga County, Ohio, United States. It is an eastern suburb of Cleveland. The population was 13,789 at the 2020 census.

== History ==
Warrensville Heights was incorporated as a village in 1927 out of Warrenville Township, which was named after local settler Daniel Warren. By the 1930s, it was recognized as the "Geranium Center of the U.S." for its greenhouse industry. The agricultural village experienced rapid suburbanization after World War II, and became a city in 1960. The city's racial demographics shifted from majority white in 1970 to majority Black in 1980.

== Geography ==
Warrensville Heights is located at 41°26′19″N 81°31′24″W (41.438653, -81.523262).

According to the United States Census Bureau, the city has a total area of 4.14 square miles (10.72 km^{2}), of which 4.13 square miles (10.70 km^{2}) is land and 0.01 square miles (0.03 km^{2}) is water.

== Demographics ==
Historical population
Census	Pop.	Note	%±
1930	877		—
1940	1,175		34.0%
1950	4,126		251.1%
1960	10,609		157.1%
1970	18,925		78.4%
1980	16,565		−12.5%
1990	15,745		−5.0%
2000	15,109		−4.0%
2010	13,542		−10.4%
2020	13,789		1.8%
2025 (est.)	13,353		−3.2%

According to the 2021 American Community Survey, Warrensville Heights has the largest percentage of Black residents of all cities and villages in Ohio, with 92.8% identifying as Black or African-American.

=== Racial and ethnic composition ===
Warrensville Heights city, Ohio – Racial and ethnic composition Note: the US Census treats Hispanic/Latino as an ethnic category. This table excludes Latinos from the racial categories and assigns them to a separate category. Hispanics/Latinos may be of any race.
Race / Ethnicity (NH = Non-Hispanic)	Pop 2000	Pop 2010	Pop 2020	% 2000	% 2010	% 2020
White alone (NH)	969	487	421	6.41%	3.60%	3.05%
Black or African American alone (NH)	13,600	12,549	12,559	90.01%	92.67%	91.08%
Native American or Alaska Native alone (NH)	25	21	25	0.17%	0.16%	0.18%
Asian alone (NH)	138	33	75	0.91%	0.24%	0.54%
Native Hawaiian or Pacific Islander alone (NH)	6	1	3	0.04%	0.01%	0.02%
Other Race alone (NH)	28	26	79	0.19%	0.19%	0.57%
Mixed race or Multiracial (NH)	230	233	342	1.52%	1.72%	2.48%
Hispanic or Latino (any race)	113	192	285	0.75%	1.42%	2.07%
Total	15,109	13,542	13,789	100.00%	100.00%	100.00%

=== 2020 census ===
As of the 2020 census, Warrensville Heights had a population of 13,789. The median age was 37.7 years. 23.5% of residents were under the age of 18 and 20.2% of residents were 65 years of age or older. For every 100 females there were 77.5 males, and for every 100 females age 18 and over there were 71.1 males age 18 and over.

100.0% of residents lived in urban areas, while 0.0% lived in rural areas.

There were 6,223 households in Warrensville Heights, of which 28.6% had children under the age of 18 living in them. Of all households, 19.1% were married-couple households, 21.6% were households with a male householder and no spouse or partner present, and 52.4% were households with a female householder and no spouse or partner present. About 37.7% of all households were made up of individuals and 15.3% had someone living alone who was 65 years of age or older.

There were 6,809 housing units, of which 8.6% were vacant. The homeowner vacancy rate was 1.7% and the rental vacancy rate was 7.9%.

Racial composition as of the 2020 census
Race	Number	Percent
White	432	3.1%
Black or African American	12,658	91.8%
American Indian and Alaska Native	28	0.2%
Asian	77	0.6%
Native Hawaiian and Other Pacific Islander	3	0.0%
Some other race	174	1.3%
Two or more races	417	3.0%
Hispanic or Latino (of any race)	285	2.1%

=== 2010 census ===
As of the 2010 United States census of 2010, there were 13,542 people, 6,043 households, and 3,696 families living in the city. The population density was 3,278.9 inhabitants per square mile (1,266.0/km^{2}). There were 6,743 housing units at an average density of 1,632.7 per square mile (630.4/km^{2}). The racial makeup of the city was 3.6% White, 93.5% African American, 0.2% Native American, 0.3% Asian, 0.4% from other races and 2.0% from two or more races. Hispanic or Latino people of any race were 1.4% of the population.

There were 6,043 households, of which 31.7% had children under the age of 18 living with them, 24.5% were married couples living together, 31.8% had a female householder with no husband present, 4.9% had a male householder with no wife present, and 38.8% were non-families. 35.8% of all households were made up of individuals, and 12.8% had someone living alone who was 65 years of age or older. The average household size was 2.22 and the average family size was 2.84.

The median age in the city was 39.2 years. 24.5% of residents were under the age of 18; 9.6% were between the ages of 18 and 24; 22.1% were from 25 to 44; 26.3% were from 45 to 64; and 17.5% were 65 years of age or older. The gender makeup of the city was 42.7% male and 57.3% female.

=== 2000 census ===
As of the 2000 United States census of 2000, there were 15,109 people, 6,325 households, and 4,048 families living in the city. The population density was 3,661.4 inhabitants per square mile (1,413.7/km^{2}). There were 6,741 housing units at an average density of 1,633.5 per square mile (630.7/km^{2}). The racial makeup of the city was 10.57% White or European American, 90.41% African American, 0.17% Native American, 0.91% Asian, 0.04% Pacific Islander, 0.32% from other races and 1.58% from two or more races. Hispanic or Latino people of any race were 0.75% of the population.

There were 6,325 households, out of which 28.6% had children under the age of 18 living with them, 32.2% were married couples living together, 27.7% had a female householder with no husband present, and 36.0% were non-families. 32.4% of all households were made up of individuals, and 9.2% had someone living alone who was 65 years of age or older. The average household size was 2.34 and the average family size was 2.95.

In the city, the population was spread out, with 25.6% under the age of 18, 7.9% from 18 to 24, 26.6% from 25 to 44, 25.5% from 45 to 64, and 14.4% who were 65 years of age or older. The median age was 38 years. For every 100 females, there were 73.7 males. For every 100 females age 18 and over, there were 66.8 males.

The median income for a household in the city was $33,204, and the median income for a family was $41,962. Males had a median income of $35,947 versus $24, 234 for females. The per capita income for the city was $18,611. About 10.4% of families and 11.4% of the population were below the poverty line, including 16.2% of those under age 18 and 9.8% of those age 65 or over.

== Education ==
The City of Warrensville Heights is served by the Warrensville Heights City School District, which has four campuses and an enrollment of approximately 1,600 students.

In 2015, the Ohio University Heritage College of Osteopathic Medicine opened a branch on the campus of Cleveland Clinic South Pointe Hospital for 50 medical students.

== Notable people ==
- Shontel Brown – U.S. representative, former member of the Cuyahoga County Council and member of the Warrensville Heights City Council
- Marcia Fudge – 18th U.S. Secretary of Housing and Urban Development, former U.S. representative and mayor of Warrensville Heights
- Bradley Sellers - Mayor and former professional basketball player. First-round draft choice of the Chicago Bulls.
