= 2021 Cleveland mayoral election =

- November 2, 2021
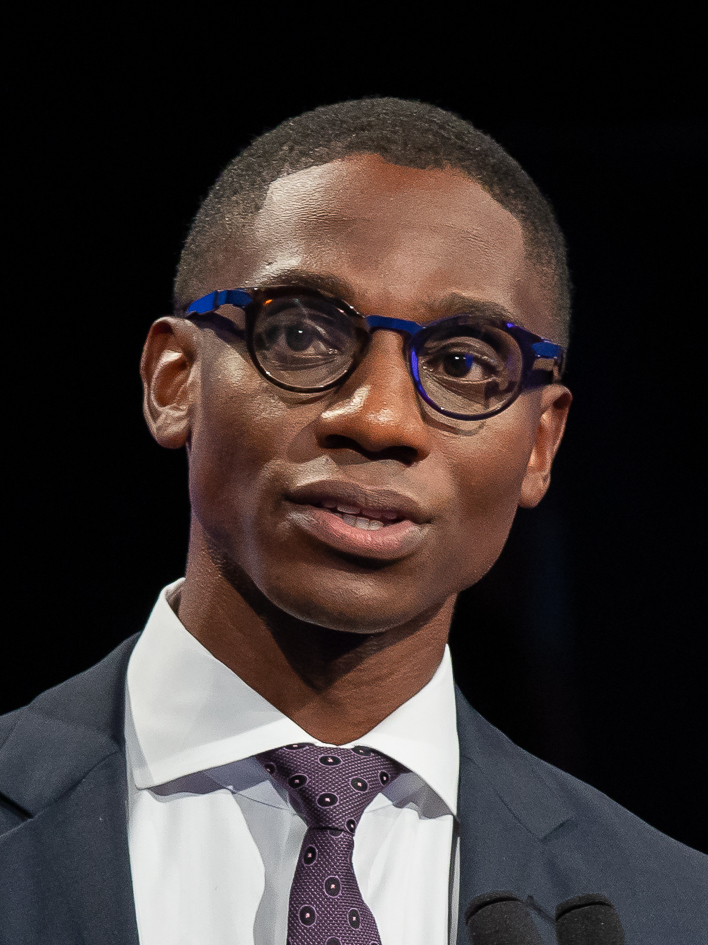

Candidate	Justin Bibb	Kevin Kelley
Popular vote	36,138	21,352
Percentage	62.86%	37.14%
- Bibb: 50–60% 60–70% 70–80% 80–90% >90% Kelley: 50–60% 60–70% 70–80% 80–90%
Mayor before election
Frank G. Jackson
Democratic
Elected mayor
Justin Bibb
Democratic

The 2021 Cleveland mayoral election took place on November 2, 2021, to elect the mayor of Cleveland, Ohio. The election was officially nonpartisan, with the top two candidates from the September 14 primary election advancing to the general election, regardless of party. Incumbent Democratic Mayor Frank G. Jackson was eligible to run for reelection to a fifth term, but instead chose to retire. Justin Bibb was elected the 58th mayor of Cleveland in the general election.

== Candidates ==
=== Winner ===
Candidate		Announced
Justin Bibb	Nonprofit executive	January 12, 2021 (Website)

=== Advanced to general ===
Candidate		Announced
Kevin Kelley	President of Cleveland City Council (2014–); Cleveland City Councilman for Ward 13 (2005–)	April 8, 2021 (Website)

=== Eliminated in primary ===
Candidate		Announced
Ross DiBello	Attorney	October 29, 2020 (Website)
Basheer Jones	Cleveland City Councilman for Ward 7 (2018–)	May 6, 2021 (Website)
Dennis Kucinich	Former mayor of Cleveland (1977–1979); Former U.S. representative from Ohio's 10th congressional district (1997–2013); Candidate for president of the United States (2004 and 2008); Candidate for governor of Ohio (2018)	June 14, 2021 (Website)
Zack Reed	Candidate for mayor of Cleveland (2017); Former Cleveland City Councilman for Ward 13 (2000–2017)	March 22, 2021 (Website)
Sandra Williams	Ohio state senator from the 21st district (2015–2022); Ohio state representative from the 11th district (2007–2014)	May 3, 2021 (Website)

=== Withdrew ===
- Landry McNord Simmons Jr., Cuyahoga County deputy sheriff and Cuyahoga County Republican Party committee member

=== Disqualified ===
- James Jerome Bell, realtor and perennial candidate
- Michael J. Chal
- Michael F. Kilbane
- Arthur O. Kostendt
- Keyshawn Dwayne Varnado
- Anthony Lee Wilson
- Latorya Jean Witcher

=== Declined ===
- Dan Brady, former president of Cuyahoga County Council, former state senator, and former city council member
- Blaine Griffin, city council member (running for re-election)
- Frank G. Jackson, incumbent mayor (endorsed Kelley)
- Dick Knoth, partner at BakerHostetler
- Martin J. Sweeney, Cuyahoga County council member, former president of Cleveland City Council, and former state representative
- Matt Zone, former city council member

== Primary election ==
=== Campaign ===
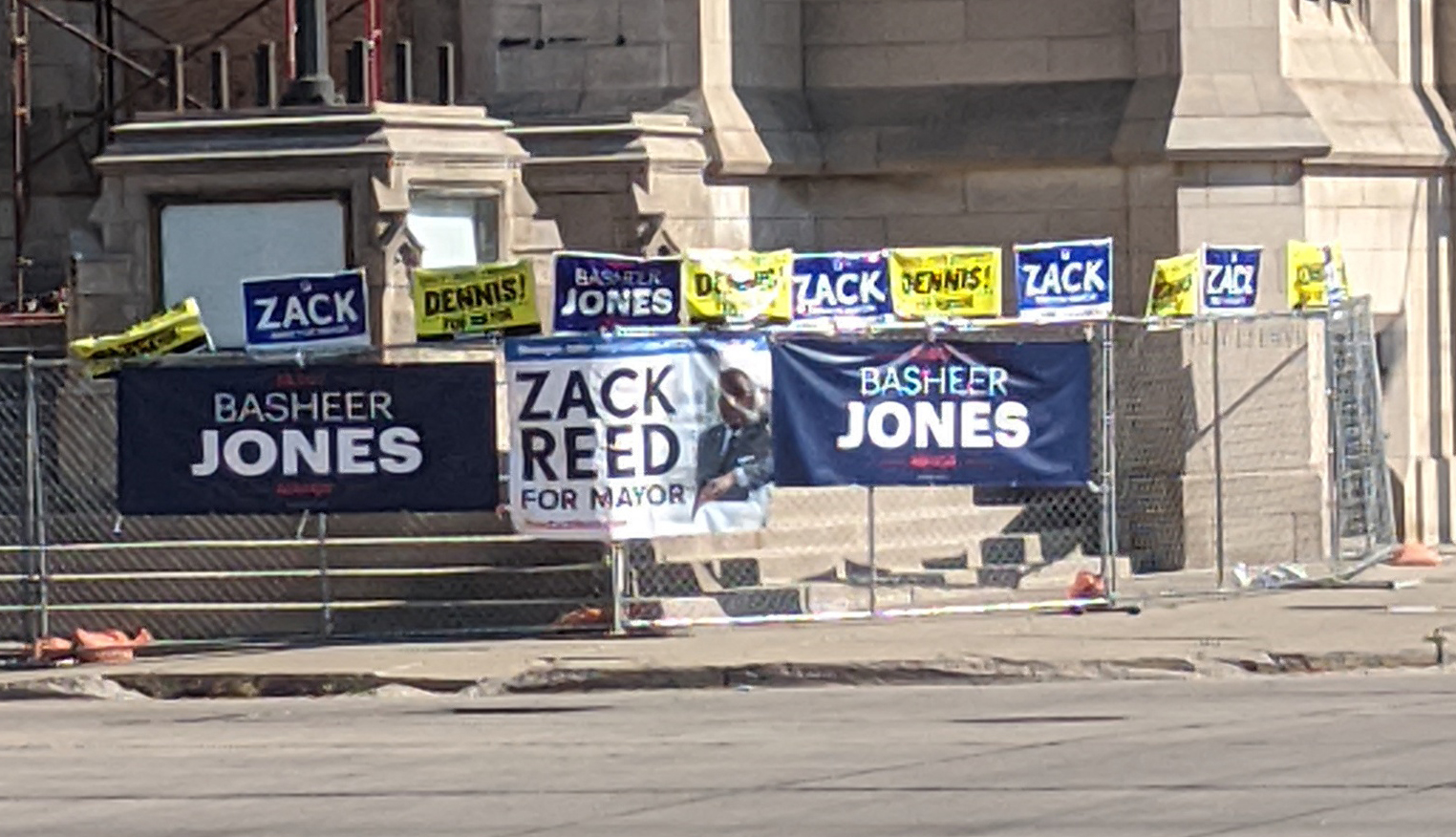
Signs for the campaigns of Zack Reed, Basheer Jones, and Dennis Kucinich in Downtown Cleveland

Ross DiBello became the first candidate to declare his intention to run on October 29, 2020. The next announcement came on January 12, 2021, when Justin Bibb became the second candidate to enter the race. In March, Zack Reed announced his second campaign for mayor after his unsuccessful run in 2017, followed by Kevin Kelley and Landry M. Simmons in April, and Sandra Williams in May.

On May 6, 2021, after much speculation, incumbent mayor Frank G. Jackson announced that he would not seek a fifth term. Jackson's announcement brought new interest to the race, as it suddenly became the first mayoral election in Cleveland since 2001 without an incumbent. Later the same day, Basheer Jones entered the race.

Dennis Kucinich, a longtime presence in Cleveland politics who had been rumored to be considering a run, announced his candidacy on June 14, 2021, two days before the deadline for submitting signatures to the Cuyahoga County Board of Elections.

Landry M. Simmons withdrew his candidacy after failing to reach the requisite 3,000 signatures needed to get on the ballot. Although municipal elections in Cleveland are officially nonpartisan, all seven qualified candidates were members of the Democratic Party.

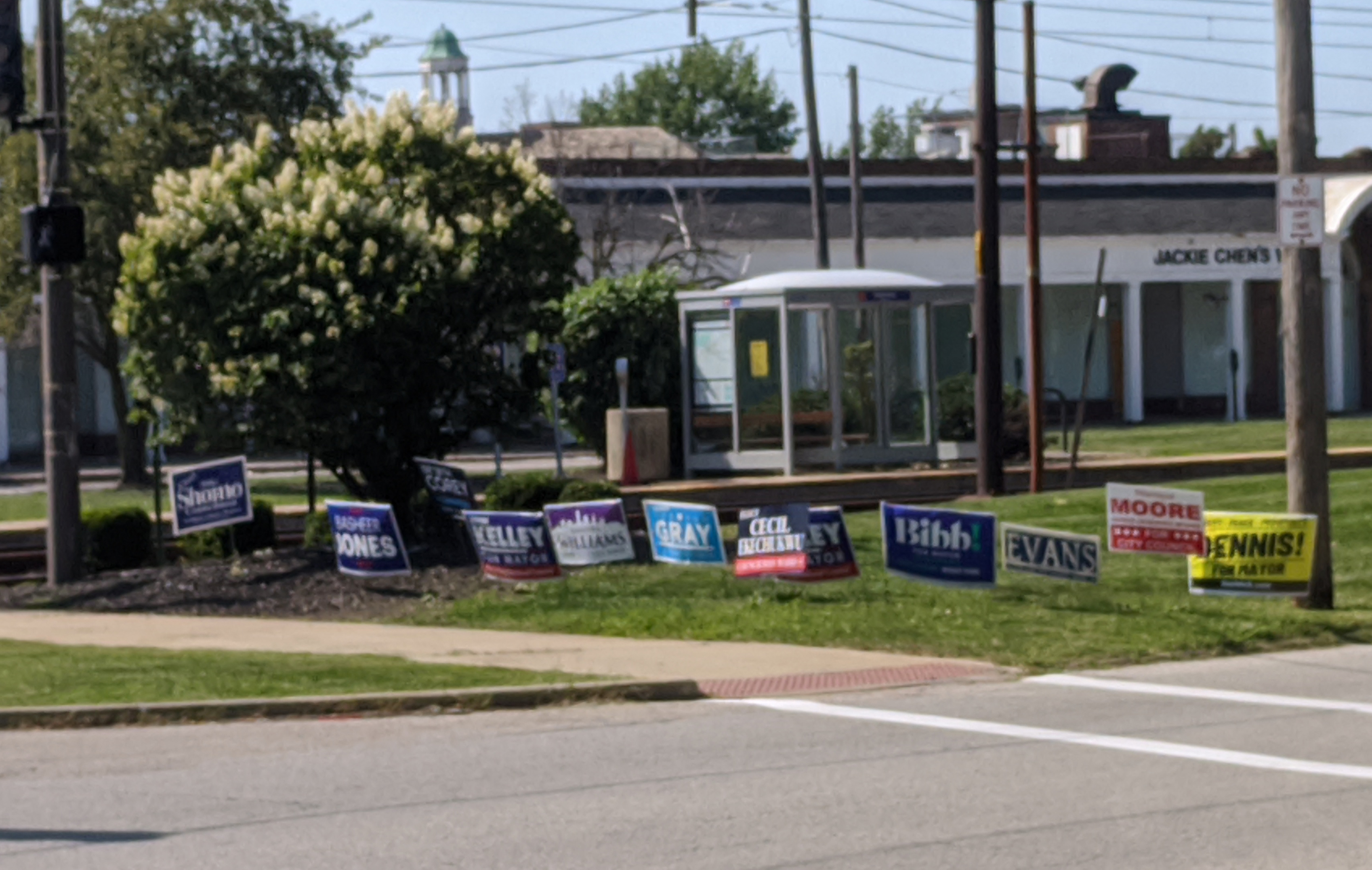
Campaign signs for city council and mayoral candidates in Buckeye–Shaker

A number of issues were debated by the candidates throughout the campaign. Every candidate except DiBello labeled crime as the preeminent issue of the race, which had reached record levels during the COVID-19 pandemic, including a 24% increase in assaults with firearms compared to 2020. Another major issue was poverty, due to Cleveland's status as the poorest major city in the United States. The issues of economic development, education, and government accountability and accessibility were also given attention, the latter in particular received emphasis due to the conviction of longtime Cleveland City Councilman Ken Johnson in late July 2021 on federal corruption charges as well as the Ohio nuclear bribery scandal.

In the primary, Justin Bibb placed first and Kevin Kelley placed second, sending both candidates to the November 2, 2021 general election. The result came as somewhat of an upset, mainly due to the unexpected weakness of Dennis Kucinich who came in third despite polling placing him in first.

The primary's 16.2% voter turnout was the highest for a mayoral primary in Cleveland since 2005.

=== Endorsements ===
Justin Bibb

State legislators

- Charles L. Butts, former Ohio state senator from District 23 (1975–1990)
- Casey Weinstein, Ohio state representative from District 37 (2019-2024)

Local officials

- Kerry McCormack, Cleveland City Councilman for Ward 3 (2016-present)
- Jay Westbrook, former president of Cleveland City Council (1990–1999), former Cleveland city councilman (1980–2013)
- Michael R. White, former mayor of Cleveland (1990–2002)

Individuals

- Connie Schultz, writer and journalist

Organizations

- Cleveland Stonewall Democrats
- The Collective PAC
- Our Revolution
- Run for Something

Newspapers

- The Plain Dealer
Kevin J. Kelley
- Frank G. Jackson, incumbent mayor of Cleveland (2006-2022)

Labor unions

- International Association of Fire Fighters Local 93
- United Association Local 55
Dennis Kucinich

Federal politicians

- Mary Rose Oakar, former U.S. representative for Ohio's 20th congressional district (1977–1993)

Individuals

- Brandon Chrostowski, CEO of Edwins Leadership and Restaurant Institute, candidate for mayor in 2017

Labor unions

- American Federation of State, County and Municipal Employees (AFSCME) Power in Action
- North Shore AFL–CIO
- Ohio State Council of Machinists (OSCM)
- Teamsters Ohio DRIVE Committee
Sandra Williams

State legislators

- Nickie Antonio, Ohio state senator from District 23 (2019–present)
- Janine Boyd, Ohio state representative from District 9 (2015–2022)
- Juanita Brent, Ohio state representative from District 12 (2019–present)
- Tavia Galonski, Ohio state representative from District 35 (2017–2023)
- Stephanie Howse, Ohio state representative from District 11 (2015–present)
- Nina Turner, former Ohio state senator and former Cleveland city councilwoman
- Kenny Yuko, Ohio state senator from District 25 (2015–2022); Minority Leader of the Ohio Senate (2017–2022)

County officials

- Armond Budish, Cuyahoga county executive (2015–2022)

Organizations

- EMILY's List

Labor unions

- Service Employees International Union District 1199

=== Debates ===
2021 Cleveland mayoral election debates
No.	Date & time	Host(s)	Moderator(s)	Link	Participants						
Key: P Participant N Non-invitee I Invitee					Bibb	DiBello	Jones	Kelley	Kucinich	Reed	Williams
1	August 10, 2021; 7:30 p.m. EDT	WVIZ; WCPN	Rick Jackson; Nick Castele	Video	P	P	P	P	P	P	P
2	August 17, 2021; 7:30 p.m. EDT	WVIZ; WCPN	Rick Jackson; Nick Castele	Video	P	P	P	P	P	P	P

=== Polling ===
Poll source	Date(s) administered	Sample size (Note: Key: A – all adults RV – registered voters LV – likely voters V – unclear)	Margin of error	Justin Bibb	Ross DiBello	Blaine Griffin	Basheer Jones	Kevin Kelley	Dick Knoth	Dennis Kucinich	Zack Reed	Sandra Williams	Undecided
Change Research (D) (Note: This poll was sponsored by the North Shore AFL-CIO, which supports Kucinich for mayor.)	August 3–8, 2021	451 (LV)	± 5.2%	12%	1%	–	11%	13%	–	20%	12%	8%	21%
Baldwin Wallace University	March 15 – April 22, 2021	421 (A)	± 5.0%	5%	1%	5%	13%	6%	2%	18%	9%	7%	48%
RABA Research	December 29–30, 2020	505 (RV)	± 4.5%	2%	–	6%	5%	10%	–	25%	13%	7%	32%

=== Results ===
Results by city council ward Bibb Jones Kelley Kucinich Reed

Primary election results
Candidate	Votes	%
Justin Bibb	10,901	27.22%
Kevin Kelley	7,702	19.23%
Dennis Kucinich	6,595	16.47%
Zack Reed	4,840	12.08%
Basheer Jones	4,801	11.99%
Sandra Williams	4,472	11.42%
Ross DiBello	639	1.60%
Total votes	40,172	100.00

== General election ==
=== Campaign ===
Due to both primary winners finding their strongest support in the West Side of Cleveland, both campaigns paid significant attention to the predominantly African-American East Side, where although Bibb was the best performing candidate, a majority of voters cast ballots for candidates other than Bibb or Kelley in the primary. On September 29, the two former East Side mayoral candidates Zack Reed and Basheer Jones made endorsements for Bibb and Kelley, respectively.

Bibb campaigned as a progressive who would change how the city works as mayor, while Kelley presented himself as a moderate and experienced politician who would be prepared to lead from the start of his tenure.

Bibb and Kelley delineated themselves heavily over Issue 24, a proposed amendment to the city charter of Cleveland that went to voters on the same ballot as the mayoral election, which would implement greater civilian oversight of the Cleveland Police Department. Bibb favored the initiative as a way to create accountability while Kelley rejected it as a danger which could potentially lead to an exodus of officers from the department. On election day, the issue passed with 32,184 votes in favor and 21,972 votes against.

=== Post-primary endorsements ===
Justin Bibb

Federal legislators

- Sherrod Brown, United States senator from Ohio (2007-2025)

State legislators

- Nickie Antonio, Ohio state senator from District 23 (2019-present)
- Charles L. Butts, former Ohio state senator from District 23 (1975–1990)
- Nina Turner, former Ohio state senator from District 25 (2008-2014)
- Sandra Williams, Ohio state senator from District 25 (2015-present), candidate for mayor in 2021

County officials

- Dale Miller, Cuyahoga County Councilman for District 2 (2011-present), former Ohio state senator from District 23 (2006-2010)
- Martin J. Sweeney, Cuyahoga County Councilman for District 3 (2021-present), former Ohio state representative from District 14 (2015-2018), former president of Cleveland City Council (2006-2014)

Local officials

- Jane L. Campbell, former mayor of Cleveland (2002-2006)
- Jeff Johnson, former Cleveland City Councilman for Ward 10 (2014-2018) and Ward 8 (1984-1989, 2010-2013), former Ohio state senator from District 21 (1990-1998), candidate for mayor in 2017

Individuals

- Otis Moss Jr., pastor and activist
- Connie Schultz, writer and journalist

Labor Unions

- American Federation of State, County and Municipal Employees Power in Action
- Service Employees International Union District 1199
- Service Employees International Union Local 1
- United Auto Workers Northeast Ohio Community Action Program Council
Kevin J. Kelley

Labor unions

- International Brotherhood of Teamsters Local 507
- International Union of Operating Engineers Local 18

=== Debates ===
2021 Cleveland mayoral election debates
No.	Date & Time	Host(s)	Moderator(s)	Link	Participants	
Key: P Participant N Non-invitee I Invitee					Bibb	Kelley
1	October 11, 2021; 7:30 p.m. EDT	WVIZ; WCPN	Rick Jackson; Nick Castele; Lawrence Daniel Caswell; Elizabeth McIntyre	Video	P	P

=== Polling ===
Poll source	Date(s) administered	Sample size	Margin of error	Justin Bibb	Kevin Kelley	Undecided
Baldwin Wallace University	September 27 – October 8, 2021	419 (RV)	± 5.1%	34%	25%	41%
Pathway Polling (D) (Note: This poll was sponsored by Kelley's campaign.)	September 17–20, 2021	492 (LV)	± 4.1%	30%	32%	38%

=== Results ===
General election results
Candidate	Votes	%
Justin Bibb	36,138	62.86
Kevin Kelley	21,352	37.14
Total votes	57,490	100.00

==== Results by ward ====
Bibb won 12 of Cleveland's 17 wards. Bibb found overwhelming support on the East Side of the city, while Kelley narrowly won the most votes on the West Side.

Results by ward
Ward	Bibb		Kelley		Total votes	Turnout %
Ward	Votes	%	Votes	%	Total votes	Turnout %
1	3,786	87.05%	563	12.95%	4,349	27.3%
2	2,373	82.45%	505	17.55%	2,878	20.9%
3	3,172	74.15%	1,106	25.85%	4,278	24.2%
4	2,872	85.76%	477	14.24%	3,349	24.4%
5	1,356	80.62%	326	19.38%	1,682	13.9%
6	2,279	80.56%	550	19.44%	2,829	20.4%
7	1,932	76.33%	599	23.67%	2,531	17.6%
8	2,664	69.54%	1,167	30.46%	3,831	27.0%
9	2,326	82.98%	477	17.02%	2,803	19.3%
10	2,093	82.18%	454	17.82%	2,547	19.0%
11	1,330	50.96%	1,280	49.04%	2,610	18.5%
12	1,355	42.96%	1,799	57.04%	3,154	23.0%
13	1,239	26.69%	3,403	73.31%	4,642	31.8%
14	766	45.79%	907	54.21%	1,673	13.1%
15	2,599	68.05%	1,220	31.95%	3,819	24.2%
16	1,382	40.46%	2,034	59.54%	3,416	24.2%
17	2,614	36.82%	4,485	63.18%	7,099	43.2%

== Notes ==
Non-independent clients
