= 2021 Cleveland City Council election =

- November 2, 2021

17 seats on the Cleveland City Council 9 seats needed for a majority
| | Majority party |
|---|---|
| Party | Democratic |
| Last election | 17 |
| Seats won | 17 |
| Seat change | Steady |
- Composition of the Cleveland City Council by political party (Note: Officially nonpartisan)
President before election
Kevin Kelley
Democratic
Elected President
Blaine Griffin
Democratic

The 2021 Cleveland City Council election was held on November 2, 2021. The primary elections were held on September 14, 2021. All 17 seats on Cleveland City Council were up for election for four-year terms. Elections in Cleveland are officially nonpartisan, with the top two candidates from the primary election advancing to the general election, regardless of party.

== Incumbent status ==
Two council members, Basheer Jones of Ward 7 and Council President Kevin Kelley of Ward 13, retired to run for Mayor of Cleveland in the concurrent mayoral election. Neither won the mayoral race.

| Ward | Name | Entered office | Running |
|---|---|---|---|
| 1 | Joe Jones | January 2018 | Yes |
| 2 | Kevin L. Bishop | January 2018 | Yes |
| 3 | Kerry McCormack | April 2016 | Yes |
| 4 | Marion Anita Gardner | June 2021 | No |
| 5 | Delores Gray | May 2021 | Yes |
| 6 | Blaine A. Griffin | May 2017 | Yes |
| 7 | Basheer Jones | January 2018 | No |
| 8 | Michael Polensek | January 1978 | Yes |
| 9 | Kevin Conwell | November 2001 | Yes |
| 10 | Anthony Hairston | January 2018 | Yes |
| 11 | Brian Mooney | February 2020 | Yes |
| 12 | Anthony Brancatelli | May 2005 | Yes |
| 13 | Kevin J. Kelley | January 2005 | No |
| 14 | Jasmin Santana | January 2018 | Yes |
| 15 | Jenny Spencer | November 2020 | Yes |
| 16 | Brian Kazy | January 2015 | Yes |
| 17 | Charles J. Slife | January 2021 | Yes |

== East Side ==
=== Ward 1 ===
Councilman Joe Jones was reelected.

Primary election results
| Party | Candidate | Votes | % |
|---|---|---|---|
| Nonpartisan | Joe Jones | 2,118 | 65.76% |
| Nonpartisan | Kimberly F. Brown | 868 | 26.96% |
| Nonpartisan | Aylwin S. Bridges | 142 | 4.41% |
| Nonpartisan | Marc Crosby | 93 | 2.89% |
| Total votes | | 3,221 | 100.00 |

General election results
| Party | Candidate | Votes | % |
|---|---|---|---|
| Nonpartisan | Joe Jones | 2,809 | 67.97% |
| Nonpartisan | Kimberly F. Brown | 1,324 | 32.03% |
| Total votes | | 4,133 | 100.00 |

=== Ward 2 ===
Councilman Kevin Bishop was reelected.

Primary election results
| Party | Candidate | Votes | % |
|---|---|---|---|
| Nonpartisan | Kevin L. Bishop | 1,520 | 73.75% |
| Nonpartisan | Monique Moore | 278 | 13.49% |
| Nonpartisan | Azel Bolden | 216 | 10.48% |
| Nonpartisan | Bill Berry | 47 | 2.28% |
| Total votes | | 2,061 | 100.00 |

General election results
| Party | Candidate | Votes | % |
|---|---|---|---|
| Nonpartisan | Kevin L. Bishop | 1,952 | 72.59% |
| Nonpartisan | Monique Moore | 737 | 27.41% |
| Total votes | | 2,689 | 100.00 |

=== Ward 3 ===
Councilman Kerry McCormack was reelected.

Primary election results
| Party | Candidate | Votes | % |
|---|---|---|---|
| Nonpartisan | Kerry McCormack | 2,215 | 73.56% |
| Nonpartisan | Ayat Amin | 615 | 20.43% |
| Nonpartisan | Mike Rogalski | 181 | 6.01% |
| Total votes | | 3,011 | 100.00 |

General election results
| Party | Candidate | Votes | % |
|---|---|---|---|
| Nonpartisan | Kerry McCormack | 2,951 | 74.92% |
| Nonpartisan | Ayat Amin | 988 | 25.08% |
| Total votes | | 3,939 | 100.00 |

=== Ward 4 ===
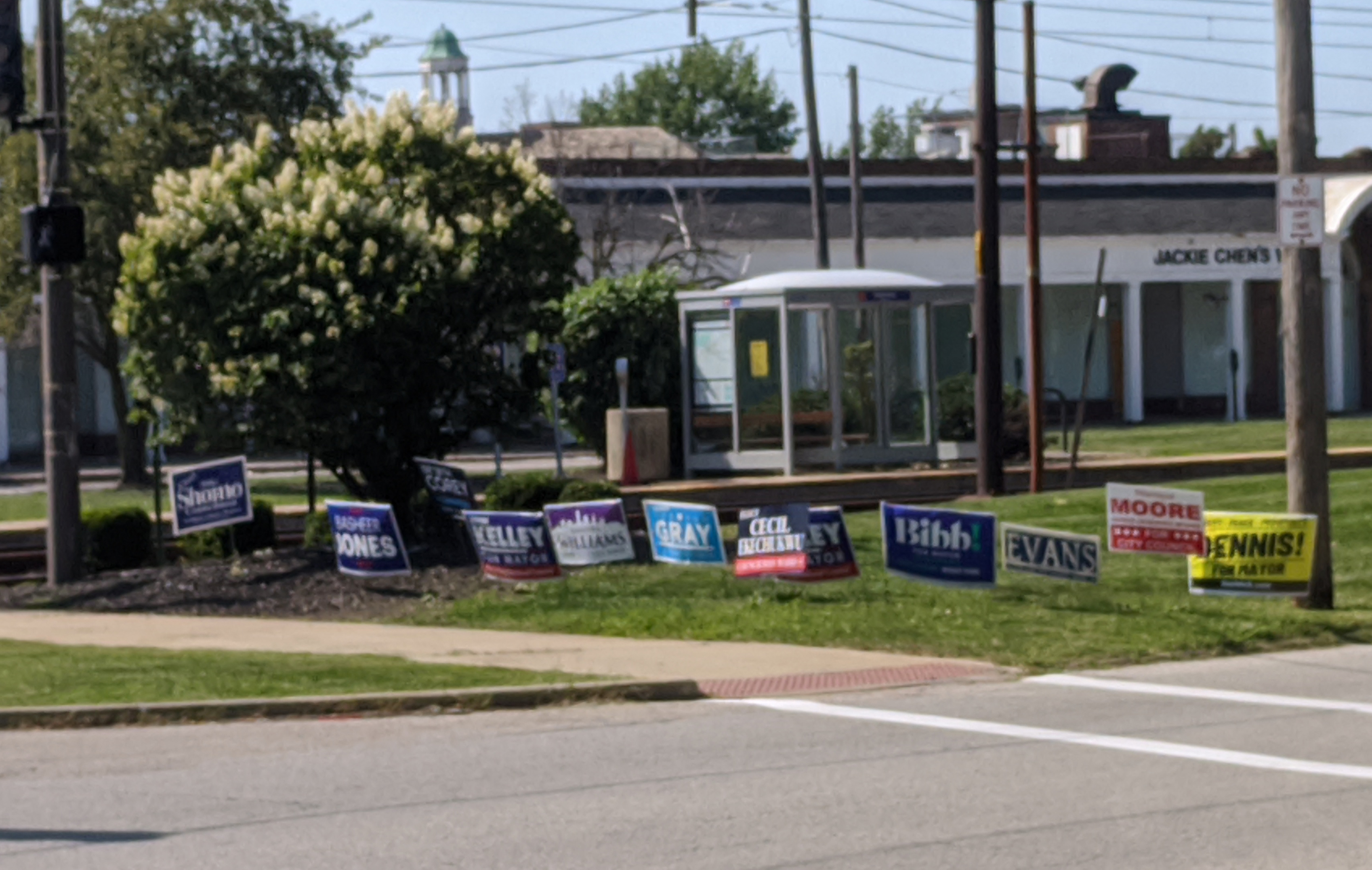
Campaign signs for City Council and Mayoral candidates in Buckeye–Shaker

Councilwoman Marion Anita Gardner was appointed by Cuyahoga County Probate Judge Anthony Russo to fill the seat of indicted Councilman Ken Johnson. Gardner chose not to run for election to a full term. Although he was legally barred from holding office, Johnson ran a campaign to regain his seat, though he would be eliminated in the primary.

Ward 4 elected Democratic precinct committeewoman Deborah A. Gray, the twin sister of councilwoman Delores Gray, who unsuccessfully ran for election to a full term in Ward 5.

Primary election results
| Party | Candidate | Votes | % |
|---|---|---|---|
| Nonpartisan | Deborah A. Gray | 670 | 26.70% |
| Nonpartisan | Erick B. Walker | 478 | 19.05% |
| Nonpartisan | Craig E. Willis | 320 | 12.75% |
| Nonpartisan | Ashley R. Evans | 243 | 9.69% |
| Nonpartisan | Kenneth L. Johnson | 190 | 7.57% |
| Nonpartisan | Mario Snowden | 149 | 5.94% |
| Nonpartisan | Cecil Ekechukwu | 141 | 5.62% |
| Nonpartisan | Mike Shomo | 95 | 3.79% |
| Nonpartisan | Arnold Shurn | 92 | 3.67% |
| Nonpartisan | Vanessa Crumb | 72 | 2.87% |
| Nonpartisan | Rowland Mitchell | 59 | 2.35% |
| Total votes | | 2,509 | 100.00 |

General election results
| Party | Candidate | Votes | % |
|---|---|---|---|
| Nonpartisan | Deborah A. Gray | 1,953 | 62.10% |
| Nonpartisan | Erick B. Walker | 1,140 | 36.25% |
| Write-in | | 52 | 1.65% |
| Total votes | | 3,145 | 100.00 |

=== Ward 5 ===
Councilwoman Delores Gray ran unsuccessfully for a full term after being appointed to fill the seat of retiring councilwoman Phyllis Cleveland. Gray was unseated by Richard A. Starr, the director of the Boys and Girls Clubs of Cleveland.

Primary election results
| Party | Candidate | Votes | % |
|---|---|---|---|
| Nonpartisan | Delores Gray | 534 | 47.72% |
| Nonpartisan | Richard A. Starr | 504 | 45.04% |
| Nonpartisan | Dyrone W. Smith | 81 | 7.24% |
| Total votes | | 1,119 | 100.00 |

General election results
| Party | Candidate | Votes | % |
|---|---|---|---|
| Nonpartisan | Richard A. Starr | 883 | 55.57% |
| Nonpartisan | Delores Gray | 702 | 44.18% |
| Write-in | | 4 | 0.25% |
| Total votes | | 1,589 | 100.00 |

=== Ward 6 ===
Councilman Blaine Griffin ran unopposed.

General election results
| Party | Candidate | Votes | % |
|---|---|---|---|
| Nonpartisan | Blaine Griffin | 2,202 | 97.09% |
| Write-in | | 66 | 2.91% |
| Total votes | | 2,268 | 100.00 |

=== Ward 7 ===
Incumbent Councilman Basheer Jones gave up his seat to run for Mayor of Cleveland in the concurrent mayoral election. Jones was succeeded by State Representative Stephanie Howse.

Primary election results
| Party | Candidate | Votes | % |
|---|---|---|---|
| Nonpartisan | Stephanie Howse | 545 | 28.70% |
| Nonpartisan | TJ Dow | 474 | 24.96% |
| Nonpartisan | Shana V. Roberts | 329 | 17.32% |
| Nonpartisan | Daniel Graves | 250 | 13.16% |
| Nonpartisan | Charlotte Perkins | 126 | 6.64% |
| Nonpartisan | Isiah X. Thomas | 49 | 2.58% |
| Nonpartisan | Antoinette M. Carter | 47 | 2.47% |
| Nonpartisan | Jeff Mixon | 39 | 2.05% |
| Nonpartisan | Mike Seals | 20 | 1.05% |
| Nonpartisan | Russ Gates | 12 | 0.63% |
| Nonpartisan | Nathaniel Cory Hartfield | 8 | 0.42% |
| Total votes | | 1,899 | 100.00 |

General election results
| Party | Candidate | Votes | % |
|---|---|---|---|
| Nonpartisan | Stephanie Howse | 1,486 | 61.84% |
| Nonpartisan | TJ Dow | 917 | 38.16% |
| Total votes | | 2,403 | 100.00 |

=== Ward 8 ===
Councilman Michael Polensek was reelected.

Primary election results
| Party | Candidate | Votes | % |
|---|---|---|---|
| Nonpartisan | Michael Polensek | 1,944 | 76.72% |
| Nonpartisan | Aisia A. Jones | 433 | 17.09% |
| Nonpartisan | Donald E. Boyd | 157 | 6.20% |
| Total votes | | 2,534 | 100.00 |

General election results
| Party | Candidate | Votes | % |
|---|---|---|---|
| Nonpartisan | Michael Polensek | 2,866 | 77.61% |
| Nonpartisan | Aisia A. Jones | 827 | 22.39% |
| Total votes | | 3,693 | 100.00 |

=== Ward 9 ===
Councilman Kevin Conwell ran unopposed.

General election results
| Party | Candidate | Votes | % |
|---|---|---|---|
| Nonpartisan | Kevin Conwell | 2,039 | 100.00% |
| Total votes | | 2,039 | 100.00 |

=== Ward 10 ===
Councilman Anthony Hairston ran unopposed.

General election results
| Party | Candidate | Votes | % |
|---|---|---|---|
| Nonpartisan | Anthony T. Hairston | 1,834 | 100.00% |
| Total votes | | 1,834 | 100.00 |

== West Side ==
=== Ward 11 ===
Councilman Brian Mooney won election to a full term.

Primary election results
| Party | Candidate | Votes | % |
|---|---|---|---|
| Nonpartisan | Brian Mooney | 777 | 45.87% |
| Nonpartisan | Michael Hardy | 493 | 29.10% |
| Nonpartisan | Donna Woods | 424 | 25.03% |
| Total votes | | 1,694 | 100.00 |

General election results
| Party | Candidate | Votes | % |
|---|---|---|---|
| Nonpartisan | Brian Mooney | 1,362 | 55.39% |
| Nonpartisan | Michael Hardy | 1,097 | 44.61% |
| Total votes | | 2,459 | 100.00 |

=== Ward 12 ===
Councilman Anthony Brancatelli was unseated by lawyer Rebecca Maurer. Brancatelli was the only elected Councilmember to lose reelection.

Primary election results
| Party | Candidate | Votes | % |
|---|---|---|---|
| Nonpartisan | Anthony Brancatelli | 974 | 45.79% |
| Nonpartisan | Rebecca Maurer | 895 | 42.08% |
| Nonpartisan | Shalira Taylor | 189 | 8.89% |
| Nonpartisan | Tawayne McGee | 69 | 3.24% |
| Total votes | | 2,127 | 100.00 |

General election results
| Party | Candidate | Votes | % |
|---|---|---|---|
| Nonpartisan | Rebecca Maurer | 1,558 | 51.18% |
| Nonpartisan | Anthony Brancatelli | 1,486 | 48.82% |
| Total votes | | 3,044 | 100.00 |

=== Ward 13 ===
City Council President Kevin Kelley gave up his seat to run for Mayor of Cleveland in the concurrent mayoral election. Voters replaced Kelley with community organizer and housing advocate Kris Harsh.

General election results
| Party | Candidate | Votes | % |
|---|---|---|---|
| Nonpartisan | Kris Harsh | 2,745 | 62.70% |
| Nonpartisan | Kate Warren | 1,633 | 37.30% |
| Total votes | | 4,378 | 100.00 |

=== Ward 14 ===
Councilwoman Jasmine Santana was reelected.

General election results
| Party | Candidate | Votes | % |
|---|---|---|---|
| Nonpartisan | Jasmin Santana | 1,042 | 65.45% |
| Nonpartisan | Nelson Cintron Jr. | 550 | 34.55% |
| Total votes | | 1,592 | 100.00 |

=== Ward 15 ===
Councilwoman Jenny Spencer was elected to a full term.

General election results
| Party | Candidate | Votes | % |
|---|---|---|---|
| Nonpartisan | Jenny Spencer | 2,796 | 84.45% |
| Nonpartisan | Chris Murray | 515 | 15.55% |
| Total votes | | 3,311 | 100.00 |

=== Ward 16 ===
Councilman Brian Kazy ran unopposed.

General election results
| Party | Candidate | Votes | % |
|---|---|---|---|
| Nonpartisan | Brian Kazy | 2,616 | 100.00% |
| Total votes | | 2,616 | 100.00 |

=== Ward 17 ===
Councilman Charles J. Slife won election to a full term.

Primary election results
| Party | Candidate | Votes | % |
|---|---|---|---|
| Nonpartisan | Charles J. Slife | 2,704 | 57.05% |
| Nonpartisan | Mary Kathleen O'Malley | 1,367 | 28.84% |
| Nonpartisan | Kenneth S. Trump | 669 | 14.11% |
| Total votes | | 4,740 | 100.00 |

General election results
| Party | Candidate | Votes | % |
|---|---|---|---|
| Nonpartisan | Charles J. Slife | 4,316 | 62.89% |
| Nonpartisan | Mary Kathleen O'Malley | 2,547 | 37.11% |
| Total votes | | 6,863 | 100.00 |
