= Justin Bibb =

Mayor of Cleveland since 2022

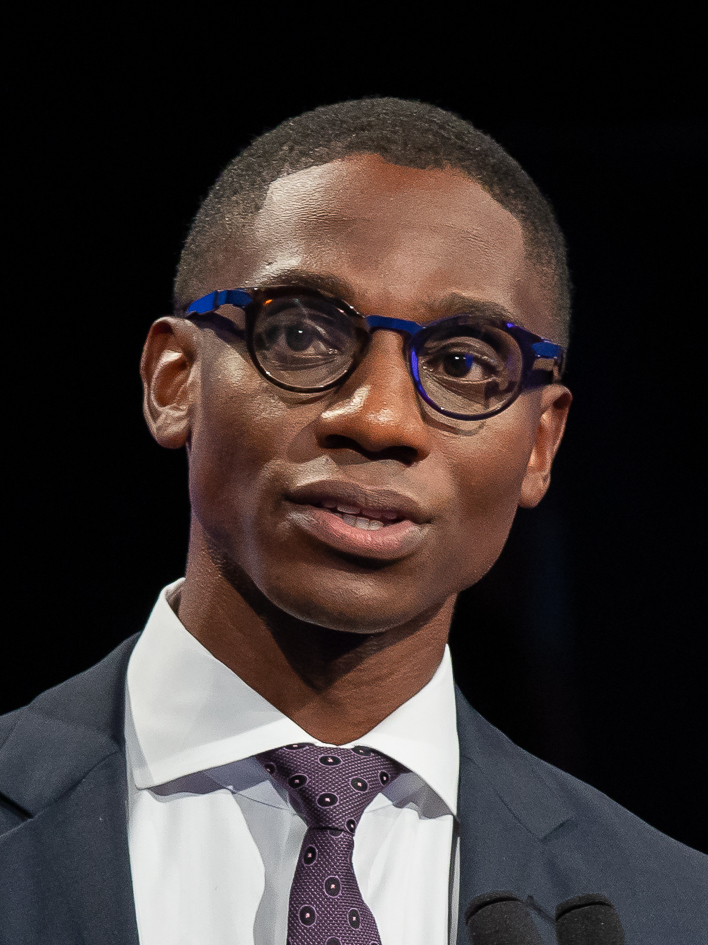

58th Mayor of Cleveland
- Incumbent
- Assumed office January 3, 2022
- Preceded by: Frank G. Jackson

Personal details
- Born: Justin Morris Bibb; April 26, 1987 (age 39) Cleveland, Ohio, U.S.
- Party: Democratic
- Education: American University (BA); Case Western Reserve University (JD, MBA)
- Website: Office website; Campaign website

Justin Morris Bibb (born April 26, 1987) is an American politician and former non-profit leader serving as the 58th mayor of Cleveland, Ohio since January 2022. Prior to serving as mayor, he was the Chief Strategy Officer of Urbanova, a startup in the government sector now known as Novara Energy Alliance. Bibb was the on the board of Teach for America – Ohio, the Greater Cleveland Regional Transit Authority, and LAND Studio.

On November 2, 2021, Bibb won the city's mayoral election, defeating President of Cleveland City Council, Kevin J. Kelley, becoming Cleveland's fourth African American mayor, and its second youngest.

== Early life and education ==
Bibb was born in Cleveland and grew up in the Mount Pleasant neighborhood and on the southeast side in Garfield Heights, Ohio. Bibb's father Donald was a police officer and firefighter, and his mother Charlene Nichols-Bibb was a social worker for the elderly. His mother said he wanted to be mayor of Cleveland since he was 16 years-old after he completed a high school civics program.

Bibb is a graduate of Trinity High School. After high school, he attended American University in Washington, D.C. where he earned a B.A in Urban Studies. During his undergraduate degree, he studied abroad at the London School of Economics where he completed The General Course program in Social Policy and Economics. In 2014, he returned to Cleveland and attended Case Western Reserve University School of Law and received his JD and MBA.

== Early career ==
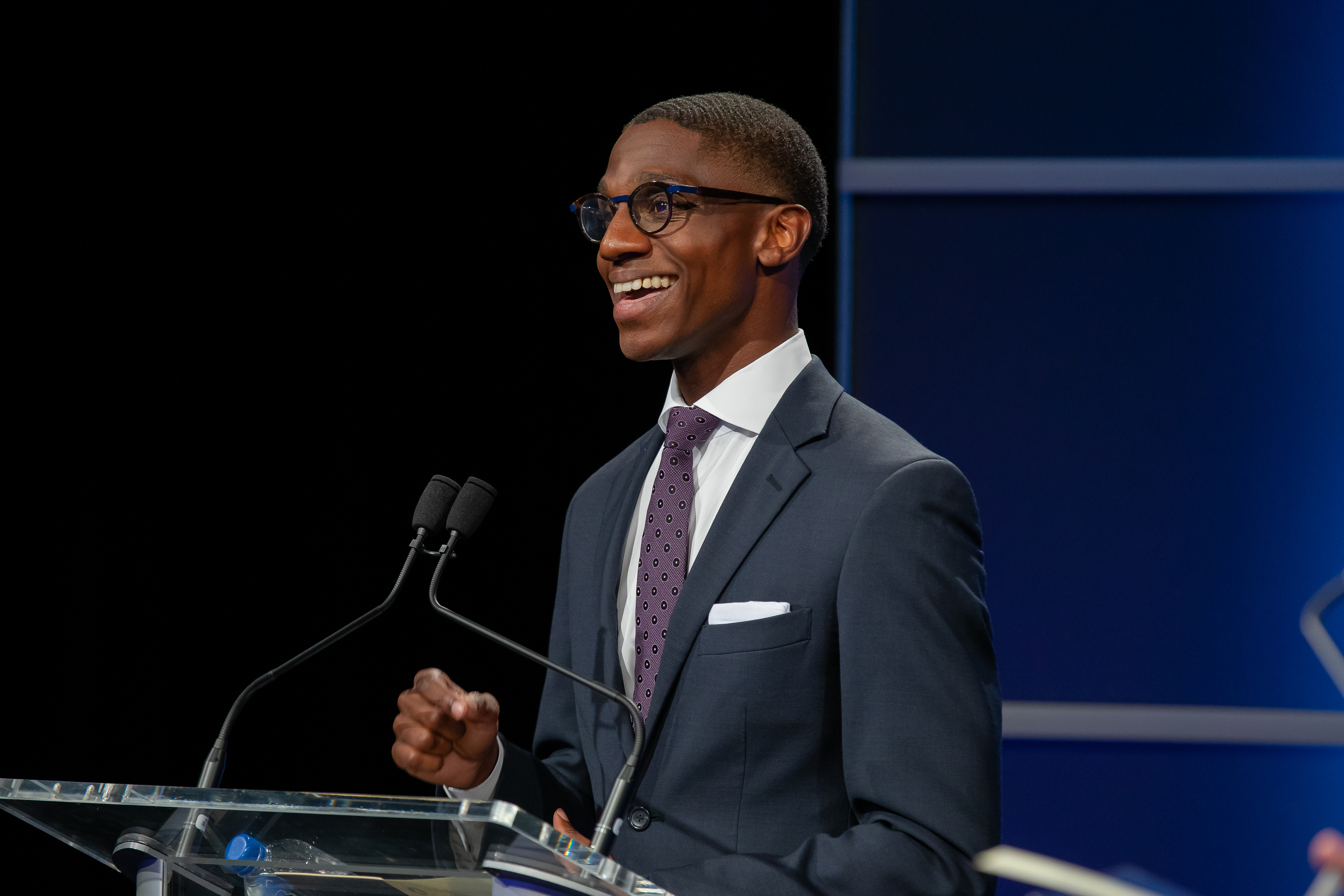
Bibb in 2021

Bibb served as an intern for then-Senator Barack Obama in 2007 and began working in local government in 2011 for as a special assistant to Cuyahoga County Executive Ed FitzGerald. Bibb worked on education initiatives, including FitzGerald’s college savings program to motivate parents to start saving early for college through a tax-free account, but the plan was ultimately scrapped for a lack of participation from parents.

After 18 months in 2012, Bibb left to become a management consultant in corporate strategy for Knowledge Generation Bureau in New York City. He returned to Cleveland in 2014 to briefly work for FitGerald and he co-founded Hack Cleveland to advocate for criminal justice reform using civic technology. While in law school he clerked for BigLaw firm Squire Patton Boggs. In his last year of law school, he took a senior position at Gallup, Inc. through a close friendship with Chairman and CEO Jim Clifton. He stayed at Gallup until 2018.

Bibb returned to Cleveland to serve as vice president of corporate strategy at KeyBank in 2019. 17 months later he left to work as an executive at Urbanova, a data company for local governments. Before entering politics, WKYC reported that he had not held the same job for more than two years.

== Political career ==
=== 2021 Cleveland mayoral campaign ===
2021 Cleveland mayoral election

Bibb announced his candidacy for mayor of Cleveland in early 2021, with a message of new leadership and a sense of urgency to Cleveland's problems. He called public safety his number one priority. Three months after launching his committee, Bibb's campaign announced that it had raised $180,000, more than every candidate besides Frank G. Jackson raised in the 2017 primaries. According to a December 2020 poll, Bibb had just 2% support among likely voters. Bibb was one of seven candidates to make the ballot.

During the campaign he brought attention to predatory property owners in Cleveland by calling out well-known out-of-town landlord Holton Wise at a press conference.

On August 8, 2021, Bibb was endorsed by the editorial board of cleveland.com and The Plain Dealer, Cleveland's major newspaper. On August 18, 2021, Bibb was endorsed by two former Cleveland mayors, Michael R. White and Jane Campbell.

On September 14, 2021, Bibb placed first in the mayoral primary, advancing him to the November 2 general election alongside City Council President Kevin Kelley. Bibb was then endorsed by dozens of prominent Black pastors including Revs. Otis Moss Jr. and E. T. Caviness. He was also endorsed by previous primary opponents Zack Reed and Sandra Williams.

Bibb faced criticism during the general election for exaggerating his role in FitGerald's office, for not holding a job for more than two years during any single stretch, and for poor attendance during his public appointments to the local government committees. WKYC reported that he missed 13 RTA board meetings, and 40% of the Cleveland Charter Review Commission meetings. Bibb responded that he was traveling a lot for work, as well as juggling his board appointments and his jobs at Gallup and later at Key Bank.

On November 2, 2021, Bibb defeated Kelley in the general election, receiving 62.86 percent of the vote, with a turnout of 23%. Bibb won 12 of Cleveland’s 17 wards, included winning 9 of 10 East Side wards with 70% of the vote or more.

=== Mayor of Cleveland ===
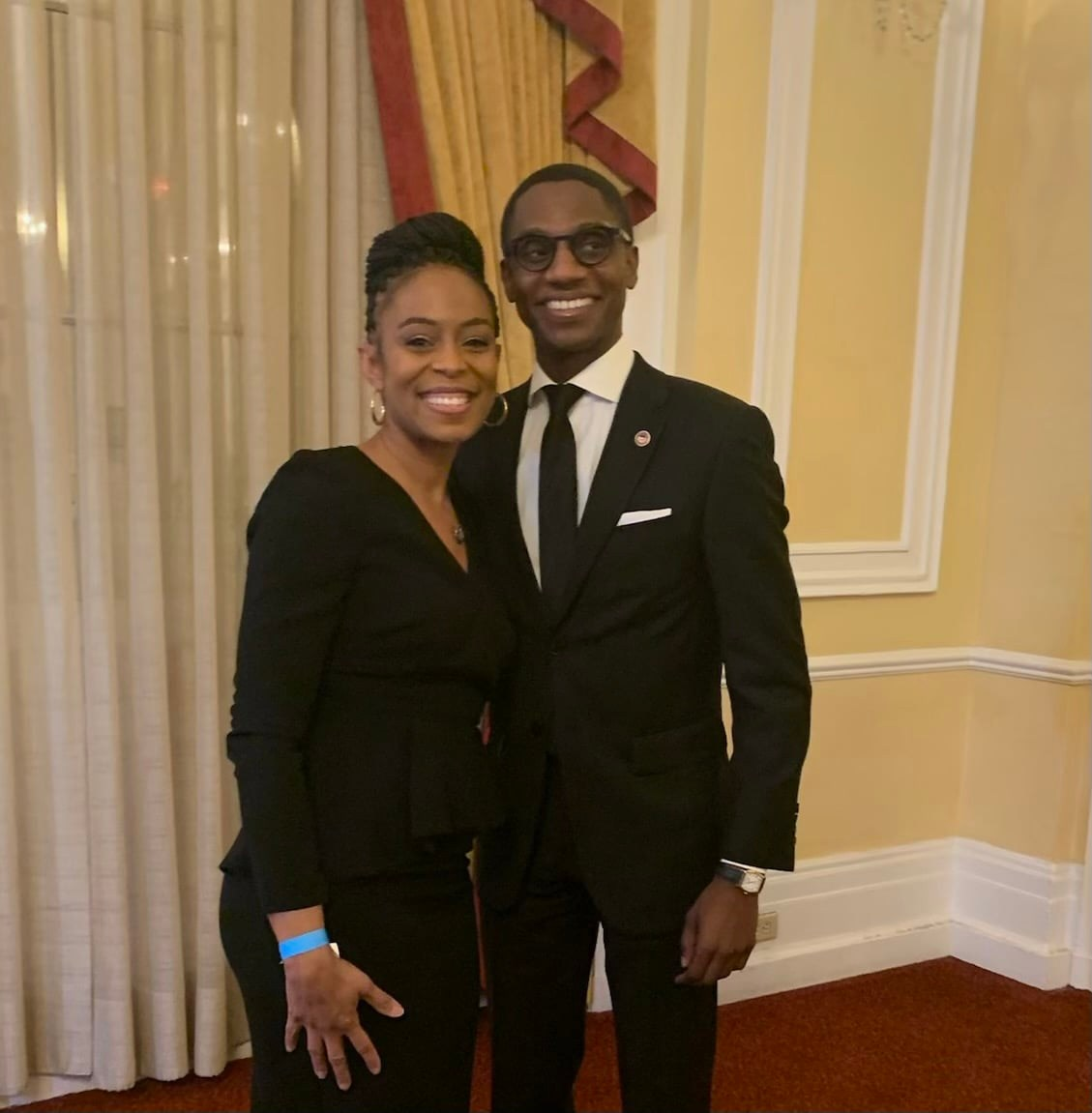
U.S. Representative Shontel Brown and Justin Bibb in at his swearing-in ceremony in 2022

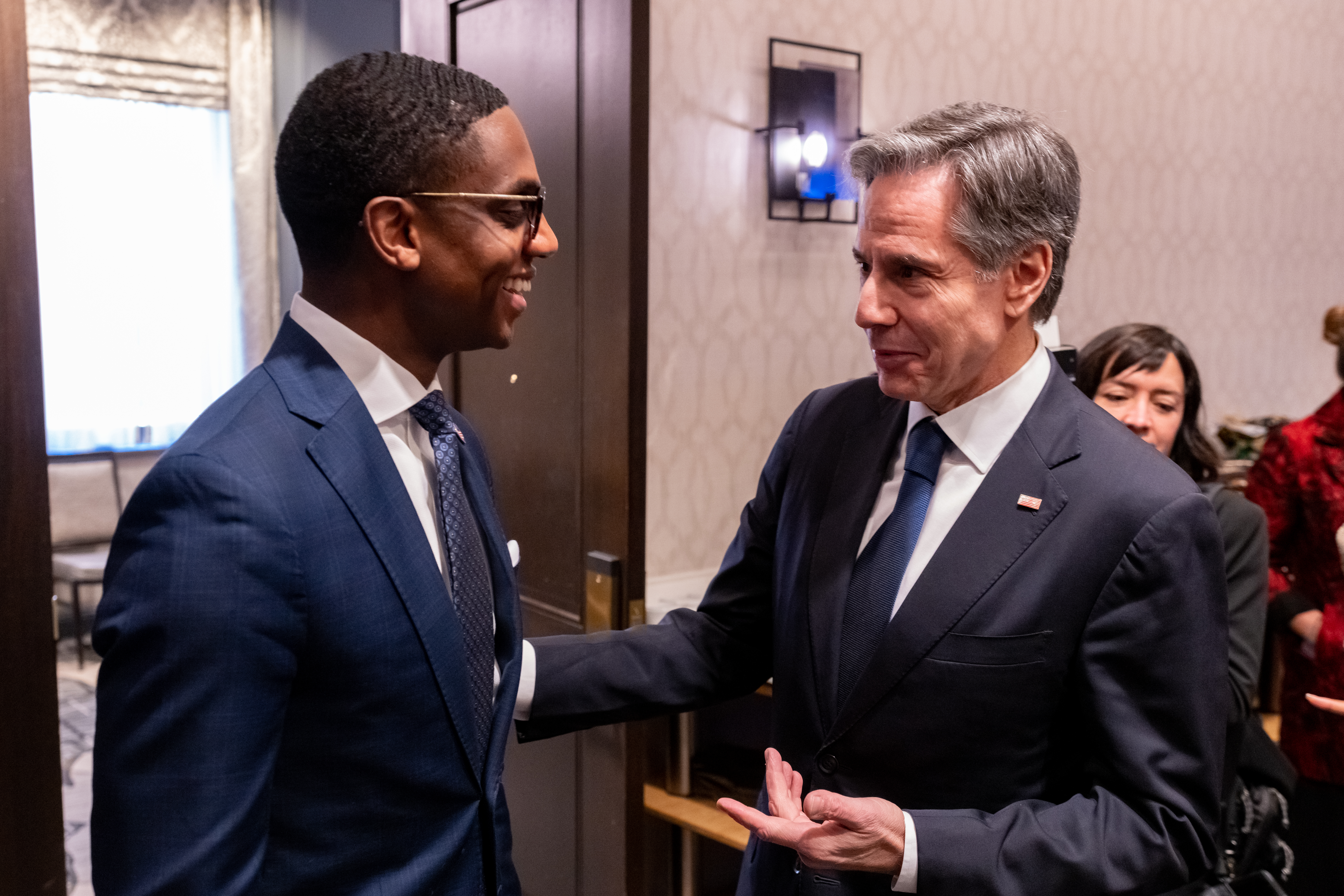
Bibb with Secretary of State Antony Blinken in 2023

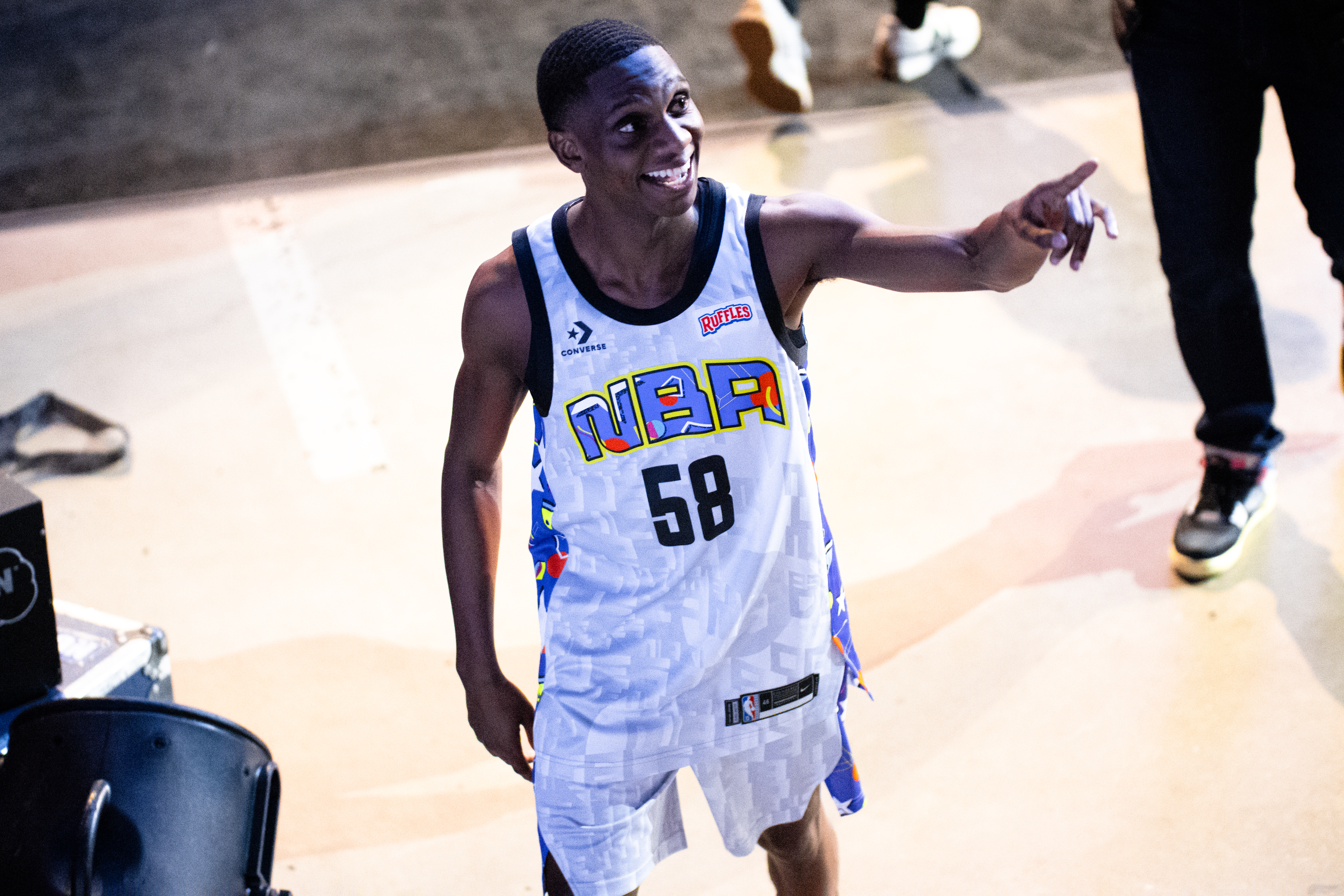
Bibb after playing in the NBA All-Star Celebrity Game during 2022 NBA All-Star Weekend in Cleveland

On January 3, 2022, Bibb was sworn in as the 58th Mayor of Cleveland.

Citizens initiated a recall petition in 2026, citing "incompetence, accountability and transparency issues, and gross fiscal mismanagement", but they failed to collect enough signatures. Axios called the effort a "long shot" due to Bibb winning reelection with 75% of the vote less than a year before.

==== Public safety ====
In June 2023, Bibb claimed that judges were being too lenient on gun violations and in setting bail amounts, and called it "frankly unacceptable." News 5 Cleveland asked five times for concrete examples, but Bibb and the city did not provide any.

In July 2023, Bibb announced an initiative to close Cleveland's police officer shortage. In August, the Bibb administration, the Cleveland Police Patrolmen's Association and Fraternal Order of Police, agreed to change officer shifts to 12 hours to spread out staffing and reduce overtime payments and offer a pay increase to Cleveland officers. The changes placed the Cleveland Police Department in the 75th percentile for officer salary in Ohio. In November 2023, Bibb called to raise the maximum age to join the police force from 40 to 55 to increase recruits.

In October 2023, Bibb announced $10 million over the next 25 years towards public safety grants for violence reduction programs. The money would come from the American Rescue Plan.

Bibb initially supported the creation of a civilian oversight board that would increase accountability of the Cleveland Police Department. Cleveland voters passed the initiative known as Issue 24 in 2021, and a commission was created made up of 13 Cleveland community members who make decisions surrounding the department's training, recruitment, and disciplinary actions. Signal Cleveland reported in 2026 that Bibb's stance on the oversight commission had been "evolving," and his administration opposed implementation and Bibb suggested changing the ordinance. Bibb said "I believe in the intent and the spirit of what Issue 24 wanted to become." The commission has also been plagued by police and community member commissioners not showing up to meetings.

In 2026, the city requested that the U.S. District Court end the consent decree that was put in place in 2015 and required federal oversight of police reform. The City and the Department of Justice under the Trump administration agreed that it was no longer necessary, but Judge Solomon Oliver denied the request, saying despite "laudable" progress, the City and DOJ "do not, and cannot show, that the City and [Cleveland Division of Police] have satisfied all of the Agreement’s terms," pointing out 10 provisions of the decree that the city had not provided evidence of compliance.

City Hall and governance

In August 2023, the city released a new website, and an Open Data Portal with crime reports, city land bank lots, Census data and parcel-by-parcel property conditions. The portal will expedite public records request and allow residents to view city data.

In 2023, the city created a new policy that would provide parental leave to eligible Cleveland city employees, including 20 hours of leave prior to the birth or adoption of a child and 480 hours of leave following. There would also be a provision to provide leave for employees who experience a loss of pregnancy. This policy would help 7,000 families.

In March 2026, The Cleveland Observer reported on the history of Bibb's clashes with members of City Council, especially President Blaine Griffin, over policy and oversight. The conflict emerged publicly during 2023 budget negotiations and grew after Bibb missed a council meeting after a shooting that injured 9 people. The 2024 Cleveland Browns relocation controversy which resulted in at $100 million settlement led Council Member Brian Kazy to say that the mayor "lied with the dogs" and now has "fleas." Griffin also criticized the deal and its impact on downtown economic development and whether taxpayers received adequate value in the deal. In September 2025, Bibb insisted that Griffin fire a city council employee for allegedly downloading over 2,200 files from GovQA, the city's public records database, including some that were confidential. The city spent over $18,000 on legal bills before dropping the investigation. The individual is still employed by city council. In an April 2026 analysis of public expenditures, local news WJW reported that Bibb spent $50,000 on a trip to Martha's Vineyard to attend a two-day economics conference, which included $1,500 for limousine service. They also reported spending $65,000 in public expenditures on chairs for a conference room in city hall, $2,200 on a mayor’s chair, and $51,000 on drapes.

==== Housing policy ====
In September 2023, Bibb introduced a plan to tighten housing codes and introduce civil penalties for code violations. The plan also focuses on vacant properties, introducing systems in an attempt to prevent livable properties from sitting empty.

In February 2023, Bibb announced his "Home for Every Neighbor Policy" which focuses on helping the city’s unsheltered find permanent housing.

In 2024, Bibb's budget included cuts to vacant housing code enforcement jobs, despite his “Residents First” housing code initiative earlier that year.

In May 2025, Cleveland almost lost $11.9 million in federal grants meant for lead paint removal, but was granted a one year extension and hired an independent contractor to complete the work. In February 2026, the Ohio Department of Development clawed back $3.3 million in different unspent funds for lead removal. Bibb initially blamed the state for placing too many restrictions on the spending which led to only 26 completed home repair projects, but later took personally responsibility and admitted that Cleveland had placed the restrictions on itself. City Council asked if he would hire a new dedicated staff member to focus on lead remediation after canceling that position in 2022, but Bibb declined. Bibb instead proposed changes to the 2019 lead-safe ordinance that would make it easier for "good landlords" who follow the rules to certify their properties. Bibb pointed to preliminary data showing that the rate of children testing positive for lead poisoning had declined from 16.8% in 2024 to 14.5% in 2025.

=== Economic development ===
The Bibb administration used $50 million of American Rescue Plan Act funding to start converting vacant lots and brownfields into shovel-ready job sites.

In 2023, Bibb announced new municipal income tax credits to businesses, with the goal to stimulate new economic development tool in the city.

In March 2024, City Council passed legislation creating a tax increment financing district in Downtown Cleveland that Bibb proposed to subsidize private redevelopment through tax breaks. It is estimated to generate between $3.5 billion to $7.5 billion in new revenue over the next 42 years.

== Personal life ==
His first cousin once-removed is journalist Leon Bibb.

== Electoral history ==
2021 Cleveland mayoral election
Primary election
Party	Candidate	Votes	%
Nonpartisan	Justin Bibb	10,901	27.22%
Nonpartisan	Kevin Kelley	7,702	19.23%
Nonpartisan	Dennis Kucinich	6,595	16.47%
Nonpartisan	Zack Reed	4,840	12.08%
Nonpartisan	Basheer Jones	4,801	11.99%
Nonpartisan	Sandra Williams	4,472	11.42%
Nonpartisan	Ross DiBello	639	1.60%
Total votes		40,172	100.00
General election
Nonpartisan	Justin Bibb	36,138	62.86
Nonpartisan	Kevin Kelley	21,352	37.14
Total votes		57,490	100.00

2025 Cleveland mayoral election
Party	Candidate	Votes	%
Nonpartisan	Justin Bibb (incumbent)	32,049	73.92%
Nonpartisan	Laverne Gore	10,853	25.03%
Write-in		456	1.05%
Total votes		43,358	100.00

Political offices
Preceded by Frank G. Jackson	Mayor of Cleveland; 2022–present	Incumbent
