= 2017 Cleveland mayoral election =

- November 7, 2017
- Turnout: 23.93%
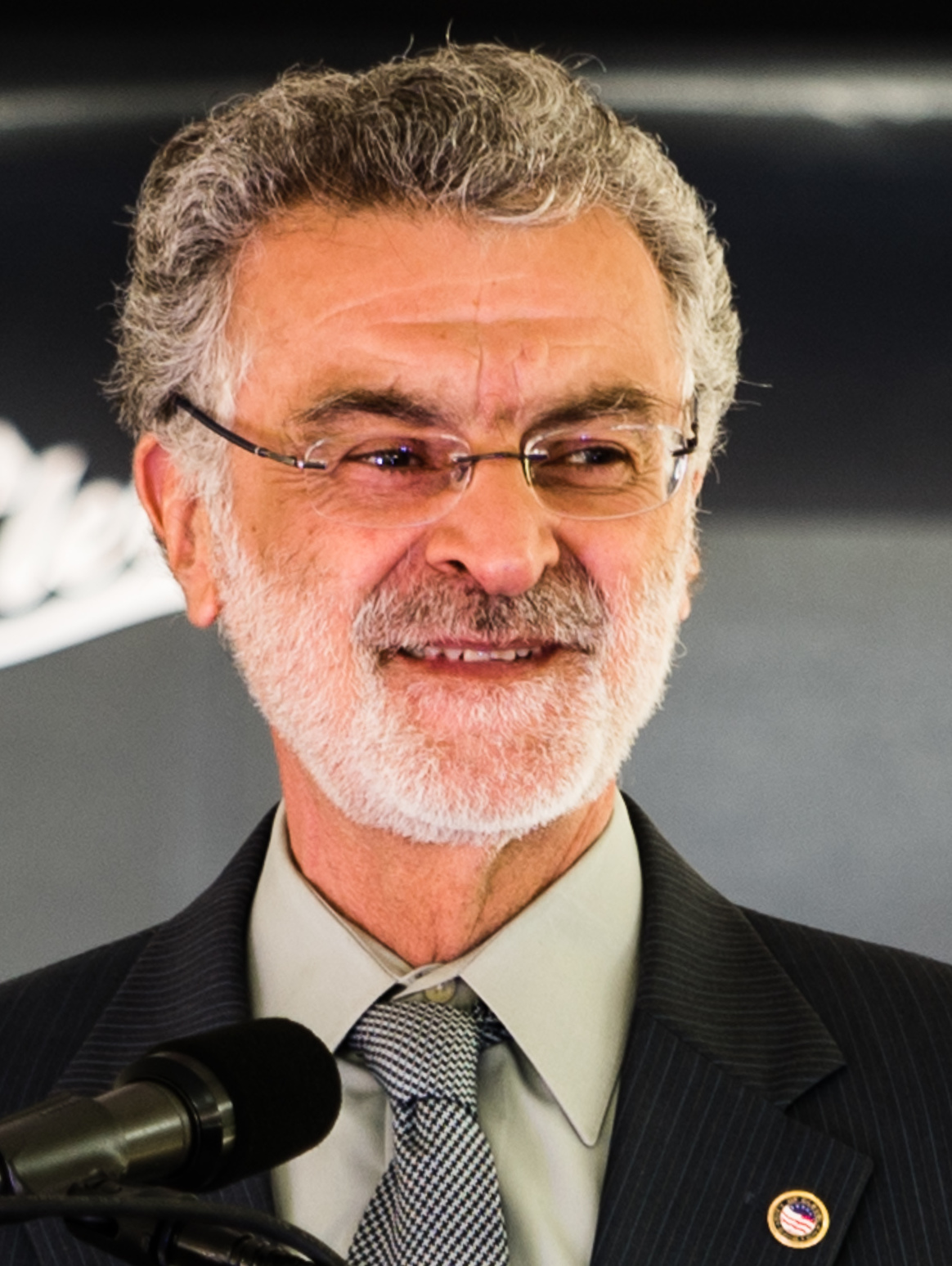

Candidate	Frank G. Jackson	Zack Reed
Popular vote	35,506	24,116
Percentage	59.55%	40.45%
- Results by city council district Jackson: 50–60% 60–70% 70–80% Reed: 50–60%
Mayor before election
Frank G. Jackson
Democratic
Elected mayor
Frank G. Jackson
Democratic

The 2017 Cleveland mayoral election took place on November 7, 2017, to elect the Mayor of Cleveland, Ohio. The election was officially nonpartisan, with the top two candidates from the September 12 primary election advancing to the general election, regardless of party. Incumbent Democratic Mayor Frank G. Jackson won reelection to a fourth term.

== Primary election ==
=== Candidates ===
==== On ballot ====
- Eric J. Brewer, former Mayor of East Cleveland (Democrat)
- Brandon Chrostowski, CEO of Edwins Leadership and Restaurant Institute
- Frank G. Jackson, incumbent Mayor of Cleveland (Democrat)
- Jeff Johnson, Cleveland City Council member and former state Senator (Democrat)
- Robert M. Kilo, Former State Director of the Fellowship of Christian Athletes, former Director of Advocacy/Government and Community Relations for Friends of Breakthrough Schools (Republican)
- Tony Madalone, CEO of Fresh Brewed Tees (Republican)
- Bill Patmon, State Representative and former Cleveland City Council member (Democrat)
- Zack Reed, Cleveland City Council member (Democrat)
- Dyrone W. Smith

===== Write-in candidates =====
- James Jerome Bell
- Camry S. Kincaid

==== Disqualified ====
- Brian S. Costa
- Kevin Cronin
- Angela Y. Davis
- Barbara A. DeBerry
- Laverne Jones-Gore, perennial candidate
- Marcus Henley
- Velimir Lucic, local business owner
- Robert Owens
- Ricky L. Pittman, perennial candidate
- Renee Saunders
- Landry M. Simmons Jr.
- Flint J. Williams Jr.

==== Withdrew ====
- Brahim Ayad
- Ja'Ovvoni Garrison

==== Declined ====
- Dennis Kucinich, former U.S. Representative and former Mayor of Cleveland

=== Endorsements ===
Frank Jackson

U.S. Representatives

- Marcia Fudge, Ohio
- Marcy Kaptur, Ohio

City Council members

- Dona Brady
- Tony Brancatelli
- Phyllis Cleveland
- Kevin Conwell
- Brian Cummins
- Blaine Griffin
- Ken Johnson
- Brian Kazy
- Martin Keane
- Kevin Kelley
- Kerry McCormack
- Terrell Pruitt
- Matt Zone

Notable individuals

- Dee Haslam, businesswoman and co-owner of the Cleveland Browns
- Jimmy Haslam, businessman and co-owner of the Cleveland Browns

Labor unions

- Cleveland Building & Construction Trades Council

Organizations

- Cuyahoga County Democratic Party

Newspapers

- The Plain Dealer
Jeff Johnson

Labor unions

- SEIU – Service Employees International Union

Organizations

- Cuyahoga County Progressive Caucus
Robert Kilo

Organizations

- Cuyahoga County Republican Party
Zack Reed

Notable individuals

- Brad Sellers, Mayor of Warrensville Heights and former NBA basketball player

=== Polling ===
Poll source	Date(s) administered	Sample size	Margin of error	James Jerome Bell	Eric Brewer	Brandon Chrostowski	Frank Jackson	Jeff Johnson	Robert Kilo	Camry Kincaid	Tony Madalone	Bill Patmon	Zack Reed	Dyrone Smith	Undecided
Zogby Analytics	August 2–8, 2017	504	± 4.4%	1%	3%	2%	33%	8%	2%	2%	1%	2%	12%	1%	35%

=== Results ===
Primary election results
Candidate	Votes	%
Frank G. Jackson (incumbent)	12,699	38.74
Zack Reed	7,195	21.95
Jeff Johnson	5,042	15.38
Brandon Edwin Chrostowski	3,112	9.49
Robert M. Kilo	1,725	5.26
Tony Madalone	1,515	4.62
Bill Patmon	883	2.69
Eric J. Brewer	479	1.46
Dyrone W. Smith	130	0.40
James Jerome Bell (Write-in)	0	0.00
Camry S. Kincaid (Write-in)	0	0.00
Total votes	32,780	100

== General election ==
=== Candidates ===
- Frank G. Jackson, incumbent Mayor of Cleveland
- Zack Reed, Cleveland City Council member

=== Endorsements ===
Frank Jackson

U.S. Representatives

- Marcia Fudge, Ohio
- Marcy Kaptur, Ohio

City Council members

- Dona Brady
- Tony Brancatelli
- Phyllis Cleveland
- Kevin Conwell
- Brian Cummins
- Blaine Griffin
- Ken Johnson
- Brian Kazy
- Martin Keane
- Kevin Kelley
- Kerry McCormack
- Terrell Pruitt
- Matt Zone

Notable individuals

- Dee Haslam, businesswoman and co-owner of the Cleveland Browns
- Jimmy Haslam, businessman and co-owner of the Cleveland Browns

Labor unions

- Cleveland Building & Construction Trades Council

Organizations

- Cuyahoga County Democratic Party

Newspapers

- The Plain Dealer
Zack Reed

Notable individuals

- Jeff Johnson, Cleveland City Council member and former State Senator
- Brad Sellers, Mayor of Warrensville Heights and former NBA basketball player

=== Polling ===
Poll source	Date(s) administered	Sample size	Margin of error	Frank Jackson	Zack Reed	Undecided
Zogby Analytics	August 2–8, 2017	504	± 4.4%	46%	27%	27%

Hypothetical polling

with Eric Brewer

Poll source	Date(s) administered	Sample size	Margin of error	Eric Brewer	Frank Jackson	Undecided
Zogby Analytics	August 2–8, 2017	504	± 4.4%	21%	47%	33%

with Jeff Johnson

Poll source	Date(s) administered	Sample size	Margin of error	Frank Jackson	Jeff Johnson	Undecided
Zogby Analytics	August 2–8, 2017	504	± 4.4%	44%	30%	26%

=== Results ===
Cleveland mayoral election, 2017
Candidate	Votes	%
Frank G. Jackson (incumbent)	35,506	59.55
Zack Reed	24,116	40.45
Total votes	59,622	100
