= Martin Sweeney =

Martin Sweeney may refer to:

- Martin L. Sweeney (1885–1960), U.S. Representative from Ohio
- Martin J. Sweeney (born 1963), American politician from Ohio
