= 2025 Cleveland mayoral election =

Local election in Ohio, US

- November 4, 2025
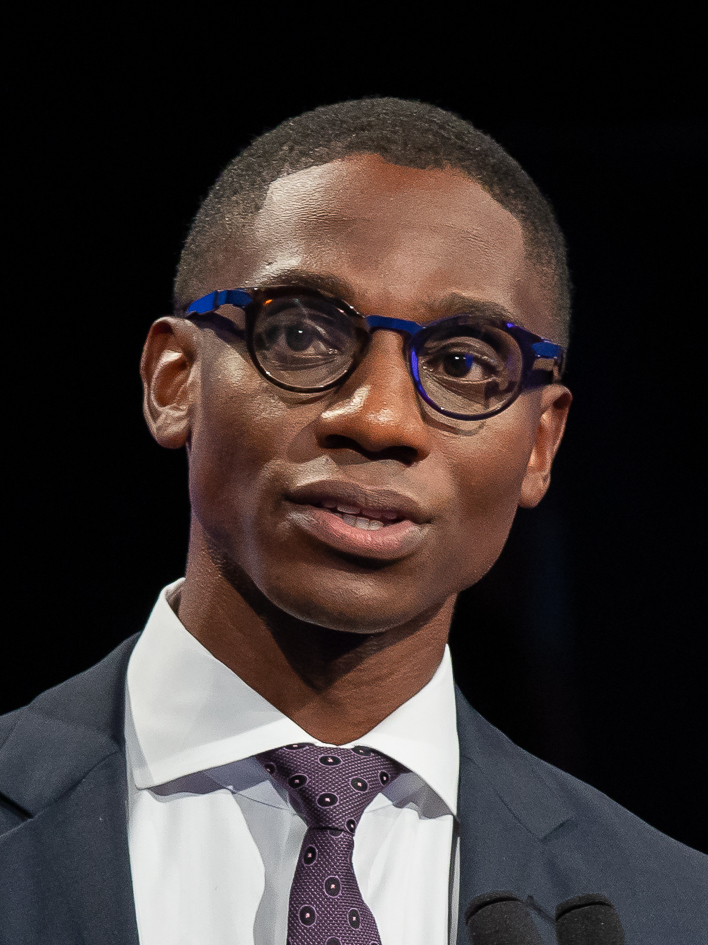

| Candidate | Justin Bibb | Laverne Gore |
| Party | Nonpartisan | Nonpartisan |
| Popular vote | 32,049 | 10,853 |
| Percentage | 73.92% | 25.03% |
Mayor before election
Justin Bibb
Democratic
Elected mayor
Justin Bibb
Democratic

The 2025 Cleveland mayoral election was held on November 4, 2025, to elect the mayor of Cleveland, Ohio. A primary election was scheduled to be held on September 9, 2025, in which the two highest-placing candidates would advance to the general election. However, it was cancelled following the June 11 filing deadline closing with only two candidates on the ballot. Municipal elections in Cleveland are officially nonpartisan.

Incumbent mayor Justin Bibb was re-elected to a second term in office by a significantly larger margin than in 2021.

== Candidates ==
=== Advanced to general ===
- Justin Bibb, incumbent mayor (Democratic)
- Laverne Gore, firm consultant and perennial candidate (Republican)

== Endorsements ==
Justin Bibb

Labor unions

- North Shore AFL-CIO

Organizations

- Everytown for Gun Safety
- Ohio Environmental Council Action Fund

== Results ==
2025 Cleveland mayoral election results
| Party | Candidate | Votes | % |
|---|---|---|---|
| Nonpartisan | Justin Bibb (incumbent) | 32,049 | 73.92% |
| Nonpartisan | Laverne Gore | 10,853 | 25.03% |
| Write-in | | 456 | 1.05% |
| Total votes | | 43,358 | 100.00 |
