= 2005 Cleveland mayoral election =

- November 8, 2005
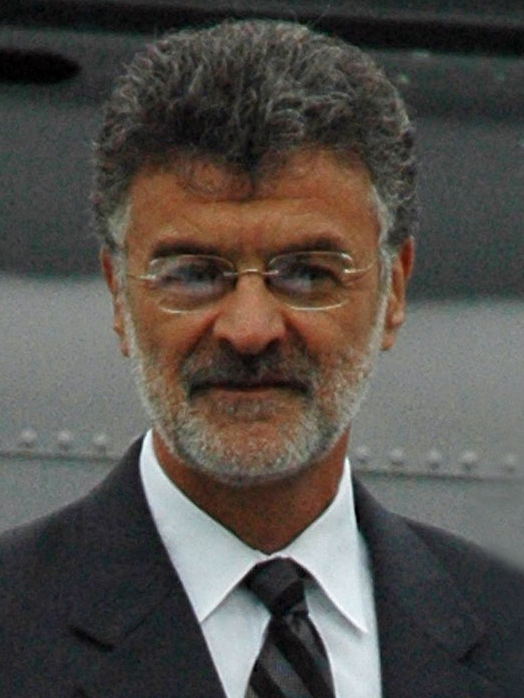

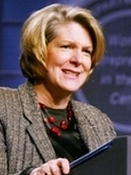
Candidate	Frank G. Jackson	Jane L. Campbell
Party	Nonpartisan	Nonpartisan
Popular vote	54,643	44,754
Percentage	54.97%	45.03%
Mayor before election
Jane L. Campbell
Democratic
Elected mayor
Frank G. Jackson
Democratic

The 2005 Cleveland mayoral election took place on November 8, 2005, to elect the Mayor of Cleveland, Ohio. The election was officially nonpartisan, with the top two candidates from the October 4 primary advancing to the general election, regardless of party.

Incumbent Democratic Mayor Jane L. Campbell ran for re-election to a second term in office, but lost the general election to Cleveland City Council President Frank G. Jackson.

== Candidates ==
- Anthony B. Brown (Democrat)
- Jane L. Campbell, incumbent Mayor of Cleveland (Democrat)
- James A. Draper, former Cleveland Public Safety Director (Democrat)
- Frank G. Jackson, Cleveland City Council President (Democrat)
- David M. Lynch, former mayor of Euclid, Ohio (Republican)
- Michael L. Nelson, lawyer (Democrat)
- Bill Patmon, former Cleveland City Councilman (Democrat)
- Robert J. Triozzi, former Cleveland Municipal Court judge (Democrat)

== Primary election ==
Primary election results
Party	Candidate	Votes	%
Nonpartisan	Frank G. Jackson	20,282	38.11
Nonpartisan	Jane L. Campbell (incumbent)	15,511	29.22
Nonpartisan	James A. Draper	5,731	10.77
Nonpartisan	Robert J. Triozzi	5,327	10.01
Nonpartisan	David M. Lynch	4,109	7.72
Nonpartisan	Bill Patmon	930	1.75
Nonpartisan	Michael L. Nelson	927	1.74
Nonpartisan	Anthony B. Brown	360	0.68
Total votes		53,217	100.00

== General election ==
=== Polling ===
Poll source	Date(s) administered	Sample size (Note: Key: A – all adults RV – registered voters LV – likely voters V – unclear)	Margin of error	Frank Jackson (D)	Jane Campbell (D)	Undecided
SurveyUSA	October 22–24, 2005	587 (LV)	± 4.1%	54%	34%	11%

=== Results ===
Cleveland mayoral election, 2005
Party	Candidate	Votes	%
Nonpartisan	Frank G. Jackson	54,643	54.97
Nonpartisan	Jane L. Campbell (incumbent)	44,754	45.03
Total votes		99,397	100.00
