= 2013 Cleveland mayoral election =

- November 5, 2013
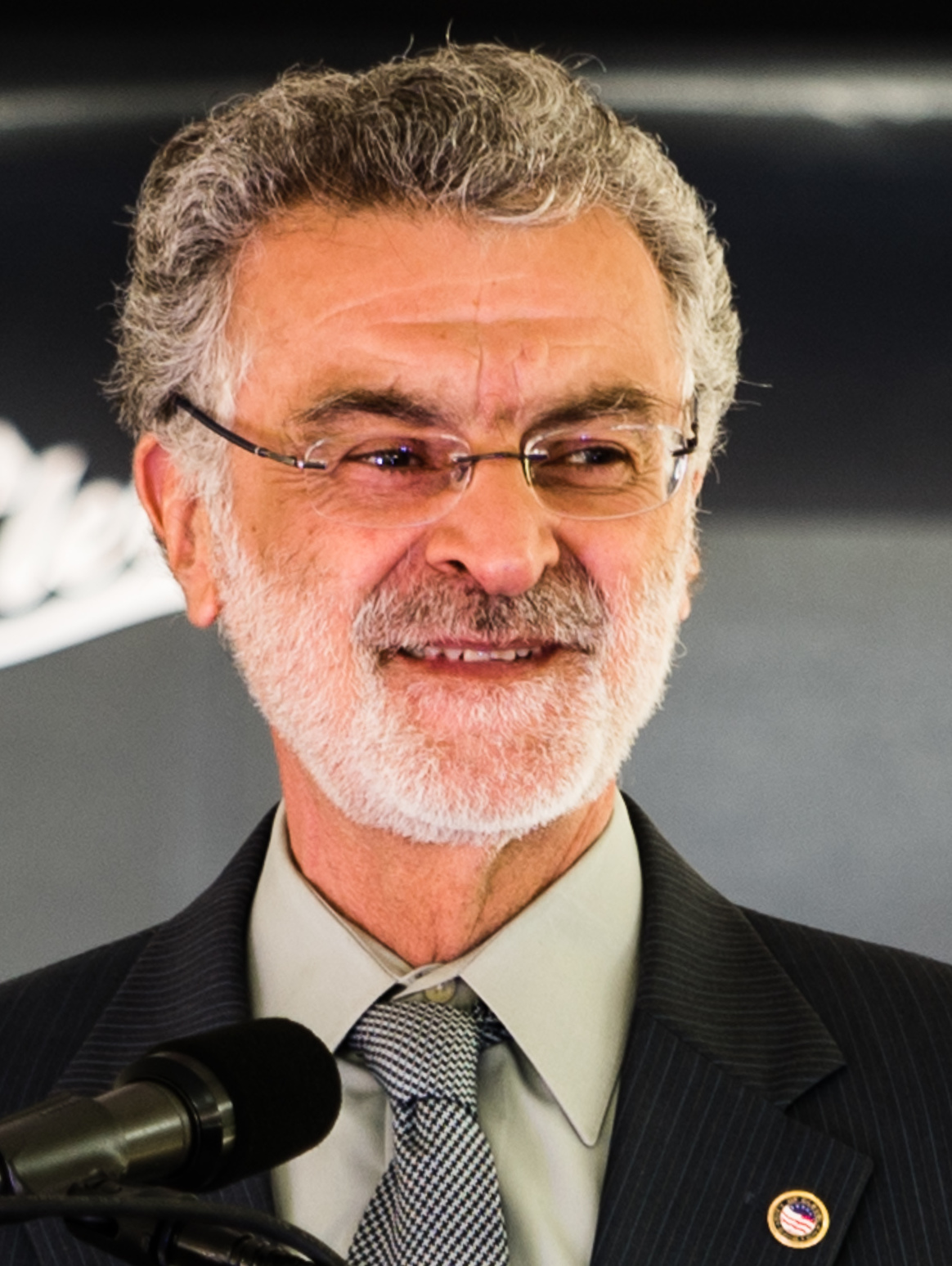

Candidate	Frank G. Jackson	Kenneth Lanci
Party	Nonpartisan	Nonpartisan
Popular vote	38,834	19,952
Percentage	66.06%	33.94%
Mayor before election
Frank G. Jackson
Democratic
Elected mayor
Frank G. Jackson
Democratic

The 2013 Cleveland mayoral election took place on November 5, 2013, to elect the Mayor of Cleveland, Ohio. Usually a nonpartisan primary is held where the top two candidates move on to the general election, however, incumbent mayor Frank G. Jackson and businessman Kenneth A. Lanci were the only two candidates to file, so no primary election was held.

While the race was officially nonpartisan, both candidates were Democrats.

== Results ==
Cleveland mayoral election, 2013
Candidate	Votes	%
Frank G. Jackson (incumbent)	38,834	66.06
Kenneth A. Lanci	19,952	33.94
Total votes	58,786	100.00
