= Joan Brown Campbell =

American Christian minister and ecumenical leader (1931–2025)

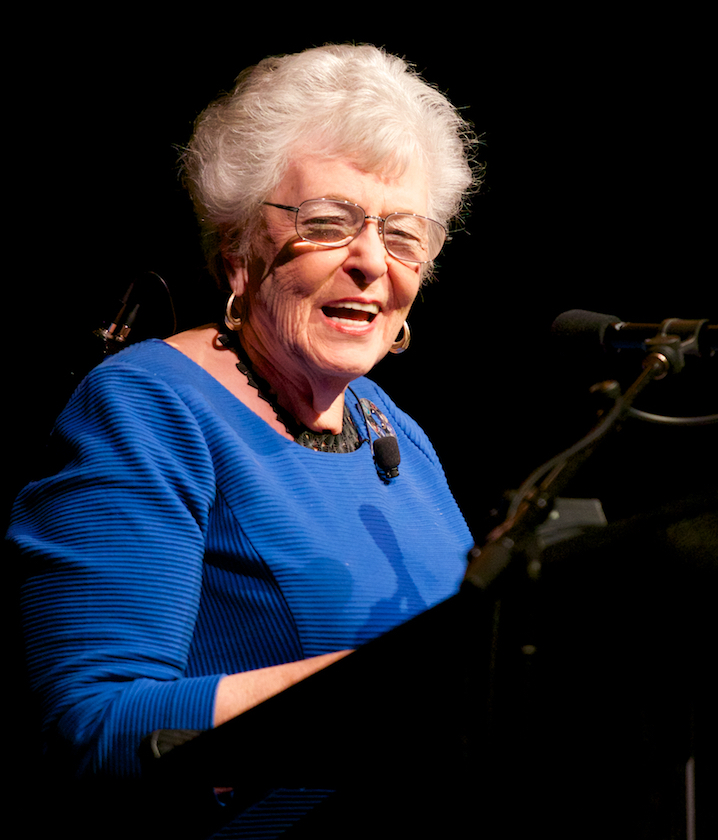
- Campbell in 2017
- Born: Joan Louise Brown; November 13, 1931; Youngstown, Ohio, U.S.
- Died: March 29, 2025 (aged 93); Chagrin Falls, Ohio, U.S.
- Occupations: Baptist minister; Ecumenical leader; Chief executive and director
- Years active: 1970–2010
- Known for: First ordained woman to serve as general secretary of NCC
- Spouses: Paul B. Campbell (m. 1952; div. 1974); Albert Mitchell Pennybacker Jr. (m. 2017; died 2022)
- Children: 3, including Jane

Joan Louise Brown Campbell (November 13, 1931 – March 29, 2025) was an American Christian minister and ecumenical leader. She had standing as an ordained minister in both the Christian Church (Disciples of Christ) and the American Baptist Church. In 1991, she became the first ordained woman to serve as the general secretary for the National Council of Churches of Christ USA. During her career, she also served as the head of the US office for the World Council of Churches, and later, as director of the Religion Department for the Chautauqua Institution. In both cases, she was the first woman to hold these roles.

== Life and career ==
Campbell was born in 1931 in Youngstown, Ohio. She attended the University of Michigan, where she first earned a Bachelor of Arts in English and Speech. Campbell then completed a Master of Arts in education in 1953, and obtained a teacher's license. She married Paul Campbell Sr., a lawyer. They were married for twenty-five years and had three children. Eventually, the marriage ended in divorce; according to Campbell, her activism on civil rights and her support of Martin Luther King Jr. led to the breakup. Their daughter Jane Campbell became the first woman mayor of Cleveland.

After raising her children, Campbell worked as the pastor at Cleveland's Euclid Baptist Church. In the 1960s, she invited King to speak at her congregation, a controversial invitation at the time. In the 1970s, she became the first woman to work as the assistant director of the Greater Cleveland Interchurch Council. In 1979, Campbell appeared with Bishop James Hickey on the City Club of Cleveland forum.

Campbell was ordained in the Christian Church (Disciples of Christ) and the American Baptist denominations in 1980. Several years later, she became the executive director of the World Council of Churches' US office; she was the first woman to hold this post. She was also a member of the board of the National Council of Churches of Christ, USA, and served terms as vice-president and assistant general secretary.

In March 1991, Campbell became the first female cleric to serve as the general secretary for the NCCC. She served in this role until December 1999. As general secretary, she represented the council at national and international gatherings, including leading a delegation to meet with Pope John Paul II after the NCCC published the New Revised Standard Version of the Bible; the delegation presented the pope with a copy of the Catholic version of the NRSV. She was the only woman to process among the clergy at the installation of Desmond Tutu as archbishop in the Anglican Church of Southern Africa. She also attended the 1994 UN population conference in Cairo, Egypt, and the 1995 UN social development conference in Denmark.

In 2000, Campbell mediated talks between Cuban leader Fidel Castro and US president Bill Clinton to allow for the return of Elián González to Cuba.

After leaving the NCCC, Campbell became the director of the Religion Department at the Chautauqua Institution in New York. She worked there for fourteen years, stepping down in 2013. She was the first woman to hold the position of director for the Religion Department in the organization's 139 years. In 2010, she published a book entitled, Living in Hope: A Call to Spiritual Action for a Time such as This. In 2013, she published Prayers from Chautauqua.

Campbell donated a collection of her papers to the Archives of Women in Theological Scholarship collection at the Burke Library, in New York.

Campbell died from complications of dementia at an assisted living facility in Chagrin Falls, Ohio, on March 29, 2025, at the age of 93.

== Awards ==
Campbell was inducted into the Ohio Women's Hall of Fame, and the Civil Rights Hall of Fame in Columbus, Ohio. In 2010, Campbell was awarded the Walter Cronkite Faith and Freedom Award by the Interfaith Alliance. In 2015, she received the Wilber Award from the Religious Communicators Council, in recognition of her work as a spokesperson for the National Council of Churches on both national and international issues.

== See also ==
- Ecumenism
- Catholic Church and ecumenism
