= Brandon Chrostowski =

American chef, restaurateur, and humanitarian

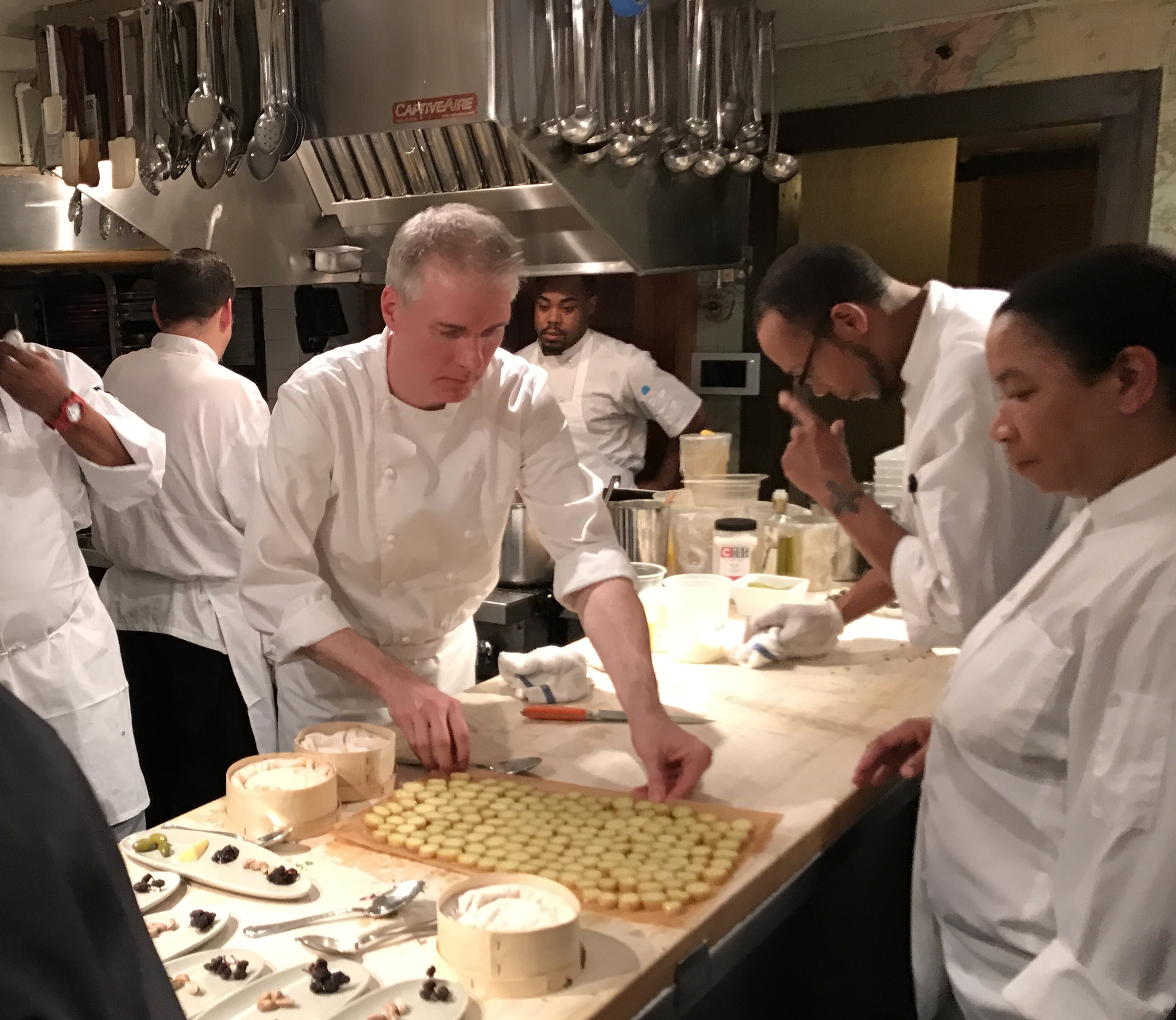
- Chrostowski cooking at the James Beard House in New York City
- Born: Brandon Edwin Chrostowski; Detroit, Michigan
- Education: The Culinary Institute of America
- Occupations: Chef; Restaurateur; Humanitarian
- Known for: Founder and President of EDWINS Leadership and Restaurant Institute
- Website: edwinsrestaurant.org

Brandon Chrostowski is an American chef, restaurateur, and humanitarian currently residing in Cleveland, Ohio. He is the founder, president, and chief executive officer of EDWINS Leadership and Restaurant Institute, a 501(c)(3) non-profit organization that acts as both a French restaurant and a culinary institute located in Cleveland's Shaker Square. It trains and is staffed largely by former prison inmates and was the subject of the 2017 Academy Award-nominated documentary short, Knife Skills. Chrostowski is also a certified sommelier and a fromager. He ran for mayor of Cleveland in 2017.

== Early life and education ==
Chrostowski was born and grew up in Detroit, Michigan. When he was 18, he was charged with resisting arrest after originally being suspected of a drug-related offense. A judge could have imposed a 10-year prison term but instead sentenced Chrostowski to one year of probation. Soon after this, he began working with Detroit chef, George Kalergis, who became his mentor. This led him to The Culinary Institute of America in New York where he earned an associate's degree in culinary arts and a bachelor's degree in business and restaurant management.

== Career ==
=== 2000–2007: Early career in Chicago, Paris, and New York ===
After finishing his studies, Chrostowski apprenticed under Charlie Trotter at his namesake restaurant (Charlie Trotter's) in Chicago. He then moved to France where he worked under Jean Bardet in Tours and Alain Senderens in Paris. For six months, he held a position at the entree chaud and patisserie station at Senderens' Paris restaurant, Lucas Carton. Around 2005, he returned to the United States, working as saucier at Terrance Brennan's Manhattan restaurant, Picholine. He also worked in the kitchens at Le Cirque and Chanterelle in Manhattan. He worked his way up to manager at the latter restaurant, which was owned by Karen and David Waltuck.

In 2007, Chrostowski incorporated the 501(c)(3) non-profit organization, EDWINS Leadership and Restaurant Institute. He had originally written a business plan for the organization in 2004 with the goal of offering professional culinary training, housing, clothing, counseling, and life-skills classes to current and former inmates. The name comes from Chrostowski's own middle name (Edwin), which he inherited from his grandfather. It is also shorthand for "Education Wins." Chrostowski moved to Cleveland in around 2008. While there, he earned a job as a manager at the French brasserie, L'Albatros. He would later become the restaurant's sommelier, fromager, and general manager.

=== 2008–2016: Life in Cleveland and founding EDWINS ===
While working at L'Albatros, Chrostowski began to raise money for his EDWINS venture via fundraisers and private donations. Initially, he developed an EDWINS program for currently imprisoned inmates at the Grafton Correctional Institution and the Northeast Pre-Release Center, which he began in 2011. In September 2012, Chrostowski publicly revealed his business plan in an effort to garner more donations. In March 2013 at a TED Talk in Cleveland, he gave a speech about the difficulties former inmates face after being released from prison. He also announced that he would resign from his position at L'Albatros to focus exclusively on EDWINS. In July 2013, he purchased a building in Cleveland's Shaker Square and began renovating it to accommodate the restaurant and training center. The restaurant opened in November 2013 and was staffed by around 55 former inmates at its outset. A total of about 80 students entered the initial class with about 35 "graduating" the six-month program.

By September 2015, the program had graduated 89 students. In November of that year, Chrostowski was listed on Crain's Cleveland Business' "Forty Under 40" list. In March 2016, he was named one of 25 CNN Heroes for that year. In August 2016, the EDWINS Second Chance Life Skills Center—a campus composed of three buildings with dormitories, a library, a test kitchen, and fitness center—was completed. Chrostowski had acquired the buildings for the project in Cleveland's Buckeye neighborhood in July 2015. The center is reserved for current members and alumni of the EDWINS program. In January 2017, Chrostowski appeared on an episode of Steve Harvey where he was honored as one of "Harvey's Heroes."

=== 2017: Mayoral run and Academy Award nominated documentary ===
In February 2017, Chrostowski announced his candidacy for the Mayor of Cleveland. To focus on his campaign, he took a leave of absence from EDWINS, appointing Tom Nobbe to temporarily fill his role. In the September primary election, Chrostowski finished fourth out of nine candidates, accruing 9.5% of the vote and losing to long-time incumbent, Frank G. Jackson. He returned to his position as President of EDWINS soon after the election.

That year, EDWINS was also the subject of the Thomas Lennon-directed documentary short, Knife Skills. Chrostowski had met Lennon at a dinner party held by his former Chanterelle bosses, Karen and David Waltuck, in September 2013. He later agreed to let Lennon film the run-up to the restaurant's launch. The film largely focuses on EDWINS' opening night in November 2013 along with Chrostowski and the restaurant's trainees. It was nominated for an Academy Award for Best Documentary Short Subject at the 90th Academy Awards.

=== 2018-2022: Restaurant and program expansion ===
In January 2018, Chrostowski led a group of EDWINS trainees preparing a dinner of fine French cuisine at the James Beard House in Manhattan.

In March 2018, Chrostowski opened the Serenite Restaurant and Culinary Institute in Medina, Ohio. The restaurant operates similarly to EDWINS but has a focus on individuals recovering from drug and alcohol addictions. The center received a $300,000 grant from the state of Ohio to start the restaurant. Chrostowski has finished the EDWINS Butcher Shop and Cafe near the EDWINS Second Chance Life Skills Center. It opened in December 2018. Over the course of its existence, the EDWINS program has graduated over 350 former inmates, and EDWINS culinary classes are held in virtually all Ohio prisons. In July 2019 Chrostowski opened up an Italian eatery helping the homeless. In partnership with the West Side Catholic Center the social enterprise launched on July 19, 2019. Chrostowski has continued his pursuit of building the best culinary school for returning citizens by opening the EDWINS Bakery on December 20, 2019. This fresh bakery and "from scratch" diner provides a deeper baking and pastry education to students and provides fresh baked goods that "feed the soul" of the nearby community. Because of the commitment that Chrostowski has for the community and excellence exhibited in culinary arts, he was recognized by the International Foodservice Manufacturers Association (IFMA) in March 2020 and named a recipient of the prestigious Silver Plate award. Continuing to expand opportunity within the community through food Chrostowski opened edwins too, a community incubator and restaurant in 2021. With an endless drive to serve those who are incarcerated Chrostowski expanded the EDWINS education inside of various prisons and jails nationwide via tablets. He is also delivering culinary education to children and at risk youths in high school. Because of the work Chrostowski pursues he has earned additional recognition in 2022 by having EDWINS named as one of fifty-two places for a changed world by the New York Times and received the James Beard award semi-finalist nomination for outstanding restaurateur in the United States.

=== 2023-Present: Deepening support in prisons across America and humanitarian work abroad ===
In 2023 Chrostowski opened yet another supportive service when he purchased a building and turned it into a child care center for students as well as purchased a fourteen unit apartment building for families. All the amenities are helping support not just local students but students traveling from afar that have completed the EDWINS tablet program while incarcerated. As of 2023 there are over 90,000 users of this program. In 2023 he was also recognized again by the James Beard Foundation receiving the finalist nomination for outstanding restaurateur in the United States. His belief that food can heal brought him to many different countries during war and conflict. It began with one of many trips to Ukraine, Israel and Djibouti For his impact in the culinary industry he received the prestigious James Beard Impact award " as well as the Auggie from the Culinary Institute of America.
