= Mary Zone =

American politician (1919–2005)

Mary Zone (December 2, 1919 – January 21, 2005) was a Democratic politician in the U.S. state of Ohio.

Mary was born Mary Constantino in Cleveland, Ohio to first generation Italian immigrants. She married childhood friend Michael Zone, and together they had nine children.

Michael served on Cleveland City Council, representing the Detroit-Shoreway neighborhood. Upon his unexpected death in June, 1974, Mary was appointed by Council President George L. Forbes to fill his seat. She was subsequently elected to three more terms, and became the first woman to serve as Cleveland City Council's majority whip.

== Family ==
Their son, Matt Zone currently represents the same area of the city on Cleveland City Council that Michael and Mary both represented. Their daughter, Peggy Zone Fisher is married to Ohio Lieutenant Governor Lee Fisher and is herself active in the Democratic Party. Their nephew, Joseph Zone, is a Cleveland Municipal Court judge.
