= The General Course =

The General Course at the LSE
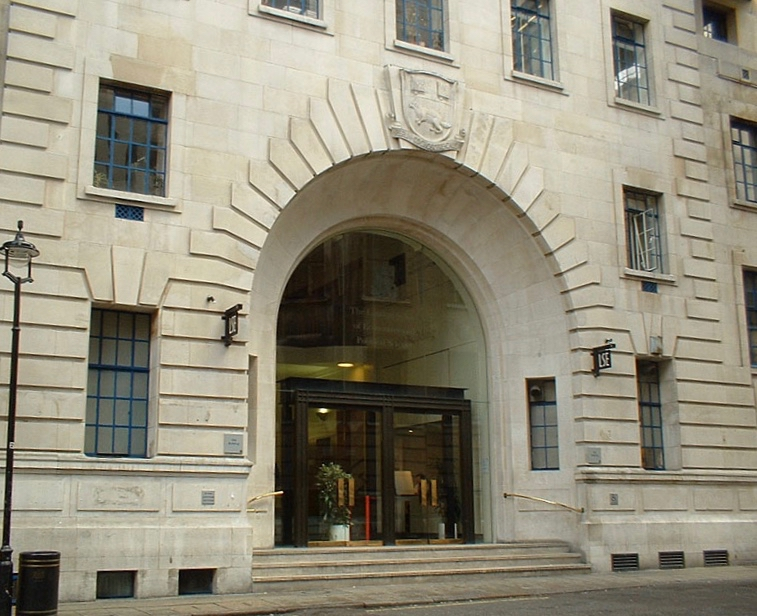
- Type: One-year study abroad programme
- Established: 1910
- Location: London, England
- Campus: Urban
- Website: www.lse.ac.uk/study-at-lse/study-abroad/the-general-course

The General Course at the London School of Economics and Political Science (LSE) is a full-year study abroad programme that has been in operation since 1910.

The General Course offers a fully integrated year of undergraduate study, offering over 300 undergraduate courses to students from 150 different countries. Accepted applicants demonstrate excellence in the social sciences and are typically within the top 10% of the class at their home institution.

Notable alumni of the General Course include David Rockefeller of the Rockefeller family, U.S. Supreme Court Justice Anthony Kennedy, Chairman of the Federal Reserve Paul Volcker, and John F. Kennedy, who was admitted and paid his fees but returned to the United States due to illness shortly after arriving in London, prior to beginning attendance.

Students must have completed at least two years of university level study prior to joining LSE, and enroll in mid to upper-level courses alongside 2nd and 3rd-year undergraduates and some graduate students.
