= Chanterelle (New York City restaurant) =

- Interactive map of Chanterelle

Restaurant information
- Established: 1979
- Closed: 2009
- Location: 2 Harrison Street, New York, New York, 10013, United States
- Coordinates: 40°43′7.8″N 74°0′32.5″W

Chanterelle was a fine dining restaurant that opened in New York's SoHo in 1979 before moving to Tribeca in 1989. The restaurant closed in 2009. David Waltuck was the chef and one of the owners. Another owner was his wife Karen.

Hugh Merwin wrote that Chanterelle “changed the way NYC Restaurants did business by making good food and service less stuffy.”. Waltuck won a James Beard Best Chef award. The restaurant won the Best Restaurant in America James Beard Award in 2004 and four star reviews from The New York Times in 1987 and 1993.

The Waltucks wanted to offer a three star Michelin experience “in an informal contemporary American setting.” Gael Greene published “rave reviews” less than a month after the restaurant opened which was the first of many such reviews. The reviews by the Times were written by Ruth Reichl and Bryan Miller.
