= Frank G. Jackson =

American politician (born 1946)

Frank Jackson
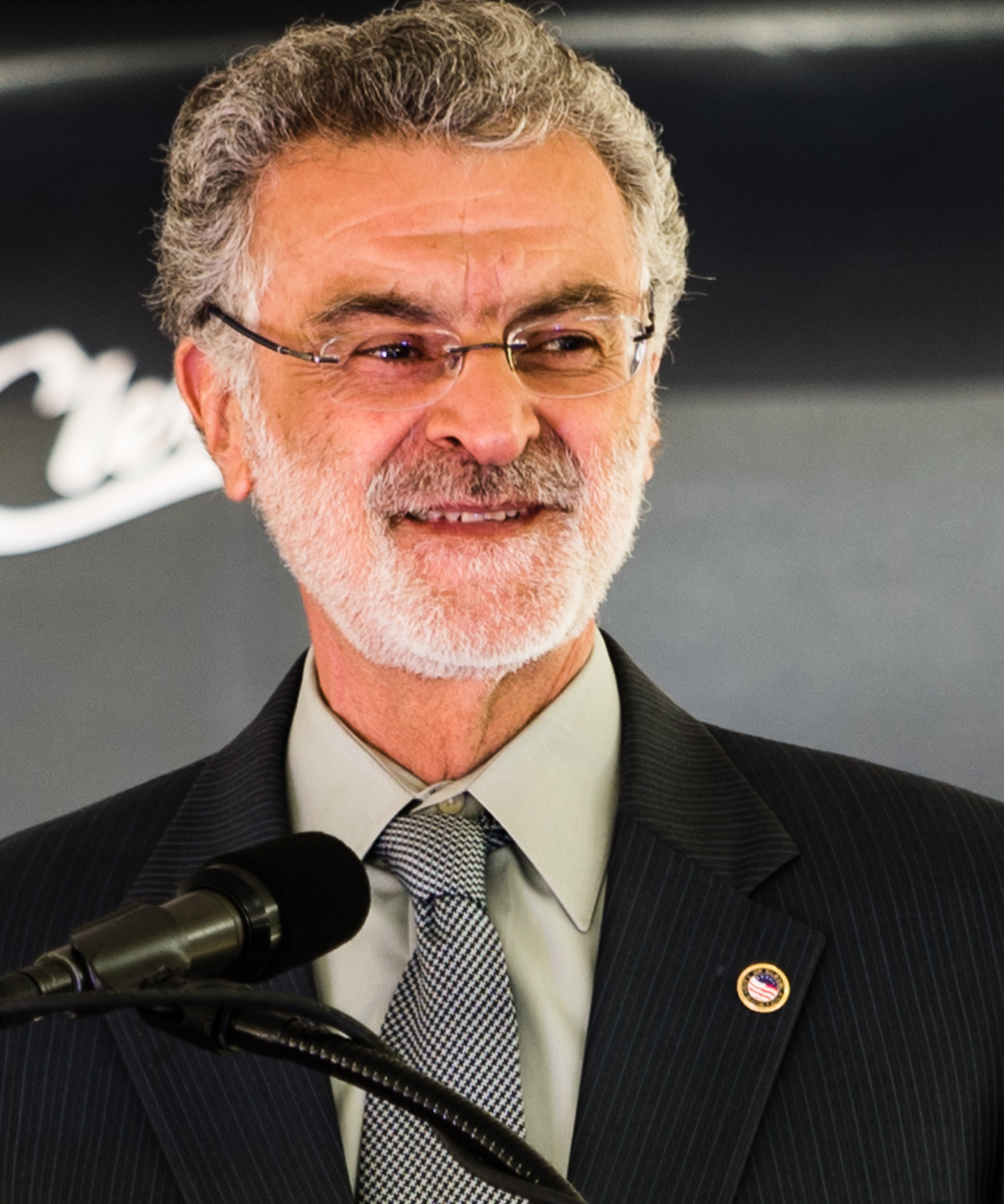

57th Mayor of Cleveland
- In office January 2, 2006 – January 2, 2022
- Preceded by: Jane L. Campbell
- Succeeded by: Justin Bibb

Personal details
- Born: Frank George Jackson; October 4, 1946 (age 80) Cleveland, Ohio, U.S.
- Party: Democratic
- Spouse: Edwina Jackson
- Education: Cuyahoga Community College; Cleveland State University (BA, MUP, JD)

Frank George Jackson (born October 4, 1946) is an American lawyer and politician who served as the 57th Mayor of Cleveland, Ohio from 2006 to 2022. He was first elected on November 8, 2005, unseating incumbent Jane Campbell, and re-elected in 2009, 2013, and 2017. Having served four full terms, he is the longest-serving mayor in Cleveland history. On May 6, 2021, he announced he would not seek re-election in 2021.

== Early life and education ==
Jackson is the son of an African American father and an Italian American mother. Jackson grew up in the Central and Kinsman neighborhoods. After graduating from Max S. Hayes High School, Jackson served in the United States Army during the Vietnam War.

After his discharge, Jackson attended Cuyahoga Community College where he earned an associate degree. He later attended Cleveland State University (CSU), earning a bachelor's degree in Urban Studies and History, a master's degree in Urban Affairs from the Maxine Goodman Levin College of Urban Affairs, and a Juris Doctor from the Cleveland State University College of Law.

== Early career ==
Jackson entered politics with the influence of former Cleveland Councilman Lonnie L. Burten. He passed the Ohio bar exam and started his legal career as an assistant city prosecutor. In 1989, Jackson won a seat on the Cleveland City Council for Ward 5. As Councilman, Jackson spearheaded efforts to bring in approximately a half billion dollars of community investments, working to clean up and stabilize his ward. He fought for the redevelopment of Arbor Park Place, the construction of the only Home Ownership Zone in the city, and worked with the Cuyahoga Metropolitan Housing Authority (CMHA) as it began to rebuild its estates.

Jackson became an active critic of then-Mayor Michael R. White, who had vowed in his campaign to clean up neighborhoods but had instead dedicated the bulk of his tenure to downtown development. Jackson's progress in Ward 5 aided his election to Council President in 2001, succeeding Michael D. Polensek.

== Mayor of Cleveland ==
=== Elections ===
==== 2005 ====
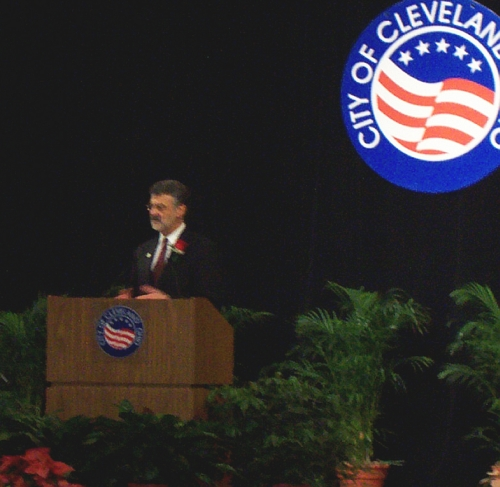
Mayor Jackson gives his inaugural address.

As Council President, Jackson became increasingly frustrated with the leadership of Mayor Jane L. Campbell. As the 2005 mayoral election approached, Jackson announced his candidacy on April 7.

He received endorsements from several notable Cleveland and Cuyahoga County politicians, including Congresswoman Stephanie Tubbs Jones, County Auditor Frank Russo, County Treasurer Jim Rokakis, and most of his colleagues on City Council. In the October 4 mayoral primary, Jackson was the top vote-getter, ahead of the incumbent Campbell. Other candidates in the primary included former Cleveland Public Safety Director, James A. Draper; former mayor of Euclid, Ohio and businessman, David Lynch; former Cleveland Councilman Bill Patmon, and Municipal Court Judge Robert Triozzi, whom Jackson eventually asked to become his law director. In the November 8, 2005 general election, he was elected mayor with 55% of the vote, while Campbell received 45%. At 11:25 p.m. (EST), she conceded to Jackson.

On January 2, 2006, Jackson was sworn in as Cleveland's 56th mayor at East Technical High School on the city's East Side. Among those in attendance were Congresswoman Tubbs Jones and Bishop Anthony Pilla of the Roman Catholic Diocese of Cleveland. In his inaugural address, Jackson vowed to make Cleveland a city where we are "one people, one community, living and working together, with respect, justice and equality." He promised improvements in the city's school system and better relations with Cleveland's neighboring suburbs.

==== 2009 ====
Frank Jackson in April 2009 announced his bid to run for another term. In the September 2009 primary Jackson garnered the most votes; in second place was former Cleveland City Council member Bill Patmon. On Election Day 2009, Jackson defeated Patmon by a large margin, with Jackson receiving 78% of the vote and Patmon receiving 22%.

==== 2013 ====
Jackson announced his intention to run for a third term on June 29, 2013. Since Jackson's bid for a third term drew only one challenger, there were no primary elections in the mayoral race. The sole challenger to Jackson was Cleveland businessman Kenneth Lanci. On Election Day 2013, Jackson defeated Lanci, with Jackson receiving 66% of the vote and Lanci receiving 34%. Upon completing his term, Jackson will become just the second Cleveland mayor, along with Michael R. White to serve three terms.

==== 2017 ====
On November 7, 2017, Jackson won his fourth term, beating councilman Zack Reed, who had finished second behind Jackson in the September nine-way primary election. This made Jackson the first ever four-term mayor in the city's history.

=== Tenure ===
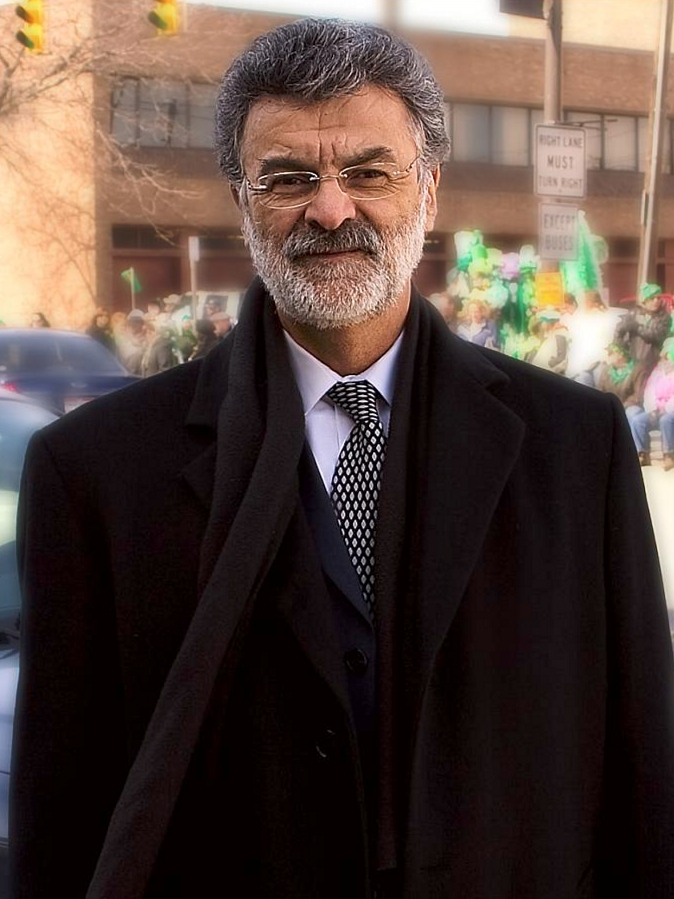
Jackson at Cleveland's 2008 St. Patrick's Day Parade.

On December 1, 2005, he announced that he would appoint the city's first point person for regional issues. On December 15, Jackson announced the appointment of his former opponent Triozzi as law director (under the city charter, the law director becomes mayor if the elected mayor is out of the city, resigns or becomes incapable of serving).

From the former Campbell administration, Darnell Brown retained his position as the city's chief operating officer. Valarie J. McCall, who had previously served as Clerk of City Council, was appointed chief of government affairs. Shortly after his inauguration, Jackson began working with the Cleveland Police Department. He introduced a new use of force policy that clearly states what previous versions only implied: "Excessive force shall not be tolerated." Jackson has restored the Cleveland Police Aviation Unit (helicopters) and the Cleveland Police Mounted Unit (horses).

He is a member of the Mayors Against Illegal Guns Coalition, a bi-partisan group with a stated goal of "making the public safer by getting illegal guns off the streets." The Coalition was co-chaired by Boston Mayor Thomas Menino and New York City Mayor Michael Bloomberg.

==== Residency laws ====
On January 18, 2008, the Ohio House of Representatives passed a bill to eliminate residency rules passed by local voters. This included the amendment to the Cleveland municipal charter that restricted city workers from living outside the city, approved by voters in 1982.

In response, Mayor Jackson and law director Robert Triozzi threatened to take the issue to court. Jackson contended that if the city's residency restrictions are overturned, Cleveland would suffer the ill effects of city workers fleeing the city, and its related effects on the economy and city safety. "This is about the issue of home rule", Jackson said at a City Hall news conference. "They are attempting to usurp our constitutional rights, and we are defending our rights".

He threatened to fire any city worker who moved out of their district of employment. The Cleveland Fire Fighters Association Local 93 and four individual union members filed a complaint on January 30 with the 8th Ohio District Court of Appeals to block any actions that Jackson, Triozzi, or the city might take on the matter. On June 10, 2009, the Supreme Court of Ohio struck down the residency requirements of Cleveland and several dozen other Ohio communities in the case of Lima v. State of Ohio.

== See also ==
- List of mayors of the largest 50 US cities

== Sources ==
- Perkins, Olivera. The Plain Dealer, October 23, 2005. "Though Private About Family, Jackson Says He Lives City's Ills".
- Perkins, Olivera; Naymik, Mark. "Jackson's Lifelong Code Drives Run For City Hall", The Plain Dealer, October 25, 2005.
- Perkins, Olivera. "Jackson Wins", The Plain Dealer, November 9, 2005.
- Baird, Gabriel. "Jackson Tightens Police Use-Of-Force Policy", The Plain Dealer, January 6, 2006
- Guillen, Joe. "Jackson Takes Part In Prostitution Sting", The Plain Dealer, January 13, 2006.
- Fields, Reginald. "City Residency Rules In Peril", The Plain Dealer, January 19, 2006.
- Atassi, Leila. "Cleveland's controversial plan to build 'trash-to-energy' facility declared dead", Cleveland.com, May 9, 2014.

Political offices
| Preceded by Michael D. Polensek | President of the Cleveland City Council; 2002–2006 | Succeeded by Martin J. Sweeney |
| Preceded by Jane L. Campbell | Mayor of Cleveland; 2006–2022 | Succeeded by Justin Bibb |
