= Deborah A. Gray =

American politician

Deborah A. Gray is a Cleveland City Council member representing Ward 4.

== Early life and education ==
Deborah Gray was born around 1955 in Saginaw, Michigan and moved to Cleveland as a child. She graduated from East Technical High School. She has two sons. She operates her own fashion business.

Deborah's twin sister Delores L. Gray, was appointed City Council person in Ward 5 in May 2021 after Phyllis Cleveland retired and recommended Delores as replacement. Delores did not win election in November 2021.

== Political career ==
Deborah was a precinct committee person and was on the executive committee for the Cuyahoga County Democratic Party. Deborah A. Gray was elected with 62% of the votes in November 2021.

Deborah supported increasing affordable homeownership with ARPA funds.

== Residences of Shaker Square ==
Building owners Chetrit Group were charged with multiple city building code violations. Deborah called Chetrit Group slum landlords. She traveled to New York City on Feb. 10 2023 to visit the co-owners of the Residences of Shaker Square, who traveled to Cleveland Feb. 22 and met with tenants.
