= Matt Zone =

American politician

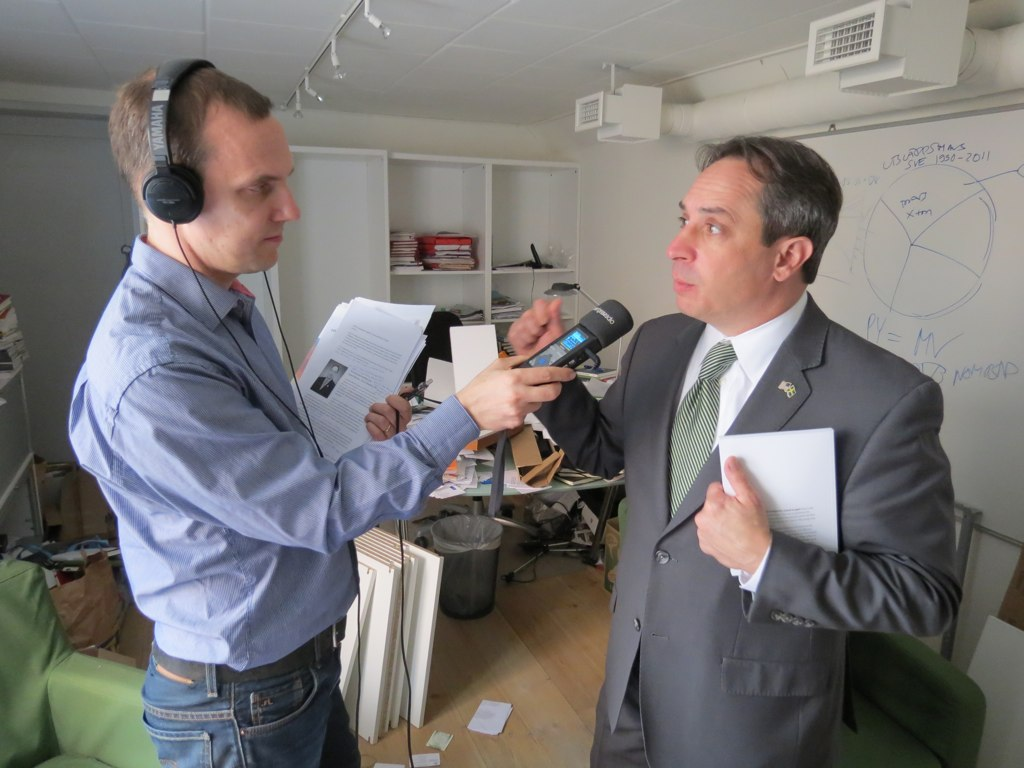
Matt Zone (right) speaks to Swedish Radio about urban sustainability initiatives in Cleveland (2012)

Matt Zone is a former Cleveland, Ohio city councilman. He was president of the National League of Cities. Zones serves as the senior vice president and director of Thriving communities. He is a member of the United States Democratic Party.

== Early life and education ==
Zone was born in Cleveland, Ohio to Michael and Mary Zone.

He graduate from Cleveland State University's College of Urban Affairs.

== Career ==
Zone was elected as a Cleveland City Councilman in 2001. He represented Ward 15 for nearly two decades before resigning in 2020 to become a senior VP at the Western Reserve Land Conservancy's Thriving Communities program in Northeast Ohio.

In 2017, he served as President of the National League of Cities.

He is the former past President of the Northeast Ohio City Council Association (NOCCA).

== Personal life ==
Zone and Michelle have one son, who is a detective with the Cleveland Police. Zone's older sister, Peggy Fisher, is married to former Ohio Lieutenant Governor Lee Fisher. His younger sister, Melissa, is an activist and urban planner in Florida. His cousin Joseph is a Cleveland Municipal Court judge.
