= Kevin J. Kelley =

American politician

Kevin Kelley

President of the Cleveland City Council
- In office 2014–2022
- Preceded by: Martin J. Sweeney
- Succeeded by: Blaine Griffin

Member of the Cleveland City Council
- In office 2005–2022
- Preceded by: Michael O'Malley
- Succeeded by: Kris Harsh
- Constituency: 13th Ward

Personal details
- Party: Democratic
- Spouse: Beth Kelley
- Education: Case Western Reserve University (MA); Cleveland State University (JD)

Kevin J. Kelley is an American lawyer and politician in Cleveland, Ohio who served as the president of Cleveland City Council from 2014 to 2022. In Council, he represented Ward 13 (Cleveland's Old Brooklyn neighborhood) from 2005 to 2022.

== Biography ==
Born in Cleveland to Catholic Irish American parents, Kelley earned his BA from Marquette University, a master's degree in social work from Case Western Reserve University, and a JD degree Magna Cum Laude from Cleveland State University Cleveland–Marshall College of Law.

On April 8, 2021, Kelley announced his candidacy for Mayor of Cleveland in the 2021 Cleveland mayoral election. On September 14, 2021 Kelley came second in the mayoral primary, advancing him to the general election alongside nonprofit executive Justin Bibb. Kelley lost to Bibb with 37% of the vote in the November 2 general election.

== Electoral history ==
1997 Cleveland City Council Ward 14 primary election
| Party | Candidate | Votes | % |
|---|---|---|---|
| Nonpartisan | Nelson Cintron Jr. | 746 | 26.66% |
| Nonpartisan | Angel A. Guzman | 698 | 24.95% |
| Nonpartisan | Kevin Kelley | 594 | 21.23% |
| Nonpartisan | Rick Nagin | 393 | 14.05% |
| Nonpartisan | William H. Corrigan | 315 | 11.26% |
| Nonpartisan | Susan Parrish-Jimenez | 52 | 1.86% |
| Total votes | | 2,798 | 100.00 |

2000 Ohio House of Representatives District 13 Democratic primary election
| Party | Candidate | Votes | % |
|---|---|---|---|
| Democratic | Mary Rose Oakar | 4,353 | 49.83% |
| Democratic | Kevin Kelley | 3,662 | 41.92% |
| Democratic | Brian Hodous | 396 | 4.53% |
| Democratic | P. Kazarovich | 324 | 3.71% |
| Total votes | | 8,735 | 100.00 |

2005 Cleveland City Council Ward 16 election
| Party | Candidate | Votes | % |
|---|---|---|---|
| Nonpartisan | Kevin Kelley | 4,193 | 76.07% |
| Nonpartisan | Robert Mastrodonato | 1,319 | 23.93% |
| Total votes | | 5,512 | 100.00 |

2009 Cleveland City Council Ward 13 election
| Party | Candidate | Votes | % |
|---|---|---|---|
| Nonpartisan | Kevin Kelley | 3,887 | 100.00% |
| Total votes | | 3,887 | 100.00 |

2013 Cleveland City Council Ward 13 election
| Candidate | Primary election | | General election | |
| Candidate | Votes | % | Votes | % |
|---|---|---|---|---|
| Kevin Kelley | 819 | 65.05 | 2,425 | 63.35 |
| Joe Gigante | 389 | 30.90 | 1,403 | 36.65 |
| Franklin J. Meslovich | 51 | 4.05 | | |

2017 Cleveland City Council Ward 13 election
| Candidate | Primary election | | General election | |
| Candidate | Votes | % | Votes | % |
|---|---|---|---|---|
| Kevin Kelley | 1,497 | 70.95 | 2,905 | 76.51 |
| Michele Burk | 310 | 14.69 | 892 | 23.49 |
| Rocco J. Crisafi | 303 | 14.36 | | |

2021 Cleveland mayoral election
| Candidate | Primary election | | General election | |
| Candidate | Votes | % | Votes | % |
|---|---|---|---|---|
| Justin Bibb | 10,901 | 27.22 | 36,138 | 62.86 |
| Kevin Kelley | 7,702 | 19.23 | 21,352 | 37.14 |
| Dennis Kucinich | 6,595 | 16.47 | | |
| Zack Reed | 4,840 | 12.08 | | |
| Basheer Jones | 4,801 | 11.99 | | |
| Sandra Williams | 4,472 | 11.42 | | |
| Ross DiBello | 639 | 1.60 | | |

Political offices
| Preceded by Martin J. Sweeney | President of the Cleveland City Council; 2014–2022 | Succeeded by Blaine Griffin |
