= Martin J. Sweeney =

American politician

Martin Sweeney

Member of the Ohio House of Representatives from the 14th district
- In office January 6, 2015 – October 1, 2018
- Preceded by: Mike Foley
- Succeeded by: Bride Rose Sweeney

Personal details
- Born: July 2, 1963 (age 63)
- Party: Democratic

Martin J. Sweeney (born July 2, 1963) is an American politician of the Democratic Party in Cleveland, Ohio. He was elected a member of the Ohio State legislature in 2014. Previously he served as the majority leader of Cleveland City Council, representing Ward 20.

He was elected council president in November 2005, when then-president Frank G. Jackson was elected mayor of Cleveland. He assumed office as council president on January 2, 2006. Sweeney graduated from Saint Ignatius High School on Cleveland's West Side in 1981. Sweeney's father is retired Cleveland Municipal Court judge Gerald Francis Sweeney.

In 2014, Sweeney decided to run for the Ohio House of Representatives. After winning a three-way primary, he won the general election over Republican 62%-38%.

He resigned from his seat in the Ohio House of Representatives in October 2018.

In January 2021, he was named Council Representative for District 3 in Cuyahoga County, Ohio, replacing Dan Brady.

Political offices
Preceded by Frank G. Jackson	President of Cleveland City Council; 2006–2014	Succeeded by Kevin J. Kelley
