= Jane L. Campbell =

American politician (born 1953)

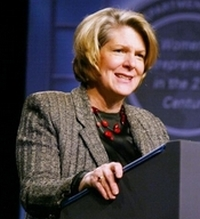

56th Mayor of Cleveland
- In office January 1, 2002 – January 1, 2006
- Preceded by: Michael R. White
- Succeeded by: Frank G. Jackson

Member of the Ohio House of Representatives from the 11th district
- In office January 3, 1985 – December 31, 1996
- Preceded by: Mary Boyle
- Succeeded by: Peter Lawson Jones

President of the National Conference of State Legislatures
- In office 1995
- Preceded by: Karen McCarthy
- Succeeded by: James J. Lack

Personal details
- Born: Jane Louise Campbell; May 19, 1953 (age 73) Ann Arbor, Michigan, U.S.
- Party: Democratic
- Education: University of Michigan (BA); Cleveland State University (MA)

Jane Louise Campbell (born May 19, 1953) is an American politician who served as the 56th and first and to date only female mayor of Cleveland, Ohio from January 1, 2002, to January 1, 2006.

== Early life and education ==
Campbell was born on May 19, 1953, in Ann Arbor, Michigan. Her mother, Joan Brown Campbell, served as the General Secretary of the National Council of Churches and her father was a partner at Squire, Sanders and Dempsey. Campbell attended Shaker Heights High School, and earned her undergraduate degree in American History from the University of Michigan. She subsequently earned a Master's in Urban Studies at the Maxine Goodman Levin College of Urban Affairs at Cleveland State University.

== Career ==
Prior to entering politics, Campbell worked with several community organizations and advocacy groups. In 1975, she co-founded WomenSpace, a coalition of women's organizations that, in addition to promoting the creation of Ohio's first shelter for battered women, helped identify and promote women for community and government leadership.

Soon after in 1979, she worked as National Field Director for ERAmerica in Washington, D.C., coordinating national support for state coalitions supporting the Equal Rights Amendment. In the early 80s, as the executive director of the Friends of Shaker Square, a neighborhood on Cleveland's east side, Campbell managed economic development, organized security patrols and expanded the historic district.

=== Politics ===
Campbell's political career began in 1984, when she was elected to the Ohio House of Representatives. She was reelected five times, and chosen by her colleagues as the majority whip and later the assistant minority leader. Legislative leaders across the country elected her to serve as president of the National Conference of State Legislatures in 1996. Campbell authored numerous laws that included tax incentives for economic development, financing for Cleveland Browns Stadium, Gateway complex (now Progressive Field and Quicken Loans Arena), authorizing prosecution of abuse and neglect of elderly and disabled people, creating a statewide review of child deaths, reforming juvenile justice, and establishing child support guidelines and penalties.

Campbell was also appointed to work with the Clinton administration on a small intergovernmental group composed of governors, mayors, county officials, and state legislators to consult on the Personal Responsibility and Work Opportunity Act.

In 1996 she was elected Cuyahoga County commissioner, a position to which she was reelected in 2000. As commissioner, she transformed the county welfare department into Cuyahoga Work and Training, the agency charged with implementing the federal welfare reform law. This reformed agency assisted over 20,000 families in moving from welfare to work between 1997 and 2001. Campbell also brokered a new public–private alliance for workforce training, and she developed training academies at Cuyahoga Community College to provide job training to dislocated workers. She also led the drive to create Cuyahoga County's first Brownfield Loan Fund in conjunction with seven local banks to redevelop abandoned industrial and commercial sites. To date, this fund has generated over $50M in private investment.

While serving as commissioner, she continued her national involvement, presiding over both the Welfare Reform: Next Step Task Force for the National Association of Counties and the association's Human Services and Youth committee.

==== Mayor of Cleveland ====
In November 2001, Campbell won the Cleveland mayoral election with 54% of the vote, defeating former Clinton administration official and attorney Raymond Pierce, who received 46% of votes. She took office on January 1, 2002, becoming the city's first female mayor.

In office, Campbell inherited a $60 million budget deficit and a city government in financial turmoil. In just one year, she stabilized the city's budget without a tax increase. However, some city services endured cutbacks, and the following year she had to lay off many city employees in order to maintain financial stability.

One of her political accomplishments was bringing the Lakefront Plan to the forefront of regional awareness, a plan that emphasized Lake Erie as the region's most valuable asset and a vital element for revitalization in Downtown Cleveland.

Throughout her four years, Campbell worked with other levels of government and the private sector to initiate nearly $3 billion of investments for urban development and redevelopment projects. By 2005, several of these projects were underway, including Steelyard Commons (a Brownfield-turned-shopping center, opened Sept. 2007), Gordon Square Arts District, Battery Park (redeveloped Eveready Battery Plant), The Avenue District, Fourth Street redevelopment, and Euclid Avenue rapid transit corridor.

Also under her administration, Ohio's first state of the art Emergency Operations Center was built, and in 2004, Cleveland became the first city in the country to host the International Children's Games. However, Campbell was criticized over her indecision on efforts to build a new city convention center and for her support for the building of a Wal-Mart store at Steelyard Commons. Her relations with City Council President Frank G. Jackson were strained, and she even faced an attempted recall effort.

Ethics of the city government dominated the headlines for much of Campbell's term. During Campbell's mayoralty, a federal corruption investigation continued from the prior city administration, resulting in subsequent convictions of two of the former Mayor's confidantes.

In 2005, Intel named Cleveland as one of the "World’s Digital Communities" in 2005, after Campbell set the stage for using technology as a platform for innovative economic development.

==== 2005 mayoral election ====
On October 4, 2005, after serving one term as mayor, Campbell came in second to City Council President Frank Jackson, in a field of seven candidates in the non-partisan mayoral primary. Only 16% of Cleveland's population participated in the primary, the lowest voter turnout in the city's history. In the November 8, 2005, general election, Jackson defeated Campbell by 55% to 45%. At 11:25 pm (EST), she conceded to Jackson, who became the city's mayor on January 2, 2006.

=== Later career ===
After leaving office, Campbell accepted a short-term position at Harvard University as part of a fellowship with the Harvard Institute of Politics. Her teaching covered issues in city governance and Ohio politics. She taught at the school during the spring of 2006.

From 2006 to 2009, she served as managing director of public-private partnerships for Colliers Ostendorf-Morris, in Cleveland's Colliers International office.

In January 2009, it was announced that Campbell would become chief of staff to Democratic senator Mary Landrieu of Louisiana. She was previously the director of the Washington Office of the National Development Council (NDC) and president of Women Impacting Public Policy (WIPP).

In 2019, Campbell became the president and CEO of the United States Capitol Historical Society.

== Personal life ==
Campbell was married to urban planner Hunter Morrison, the head of Youngstown State University's Office of Campus Planning and Community Partnerships. Campbell and Morrison have two daughters, Jessica and Catherine Campbell-Morrison. The couple divorced in 2008.

== See also ==
- List of first female mayors

Political offices
Preceded by Michael R. White	Mayor of Cleveland; 2002–2006	Succeeded by Frank G. Jackson
