= Hilton Garden Inn (Cleveland) =

Coordinates: 41°29′46″N 81°40′53″W

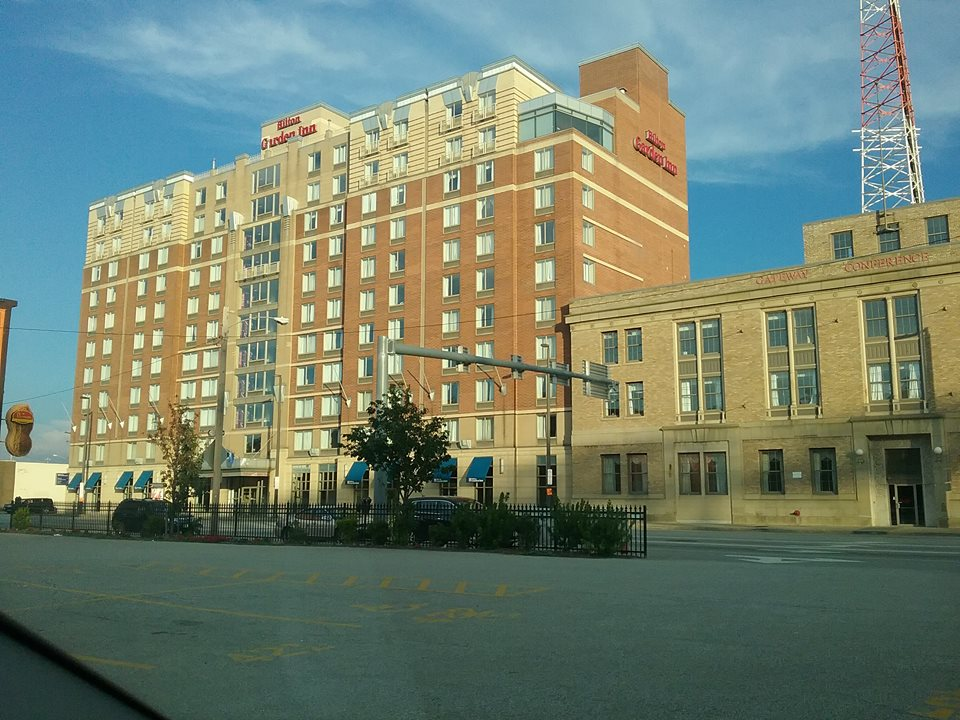
- Interactive map of the Hilton Garden Inn area
- Former names: None

General information
- Type: Hotel
- Location: 1100 Carnegie Avenue Cleveland, Ohio 44115 United States
- Construction started: 2000
- Completed: 2002

Height
- Roof: 36.57 m (120 ft)

Technical details
- Floor count: 11

Design and construction
- Architect: City Architecture

Other information
- Number of rooms: 240

The Hilton Garden Inn is a 120-foot 11 story high-rise hotel in the downtown Cleveland Gateway District. It is postmodern in style and has a color scheme of light red and beige. The Hilton is very squat in structure and occupies over a city block of space length wise, however, width wise it is very thin. It is connected to the Gateway Conference Center. The hotel features 240 rooms and sits directly across the street from Progressive Field which is the home of the Cleveland Guardians. It opened in 2002. It was one of the first major new hotels constructed in the central city area of downtown in the new millennium. It is one of four Hilton hotels in Cleveland, the other four being the Hilton Cleveland Downtown Hotel, the Double Tree Hotel Cleveland, and the Hampton Inn (Cleveland).

The hotel's location on Carnegie Avenue affords it a view of downtown and surrounding areas. Its location adjacent to offramps to Interstates 71, 77, and 90 makes it the city's only downtown hotel near a major highway.
