= Tim Hagan =

American politician

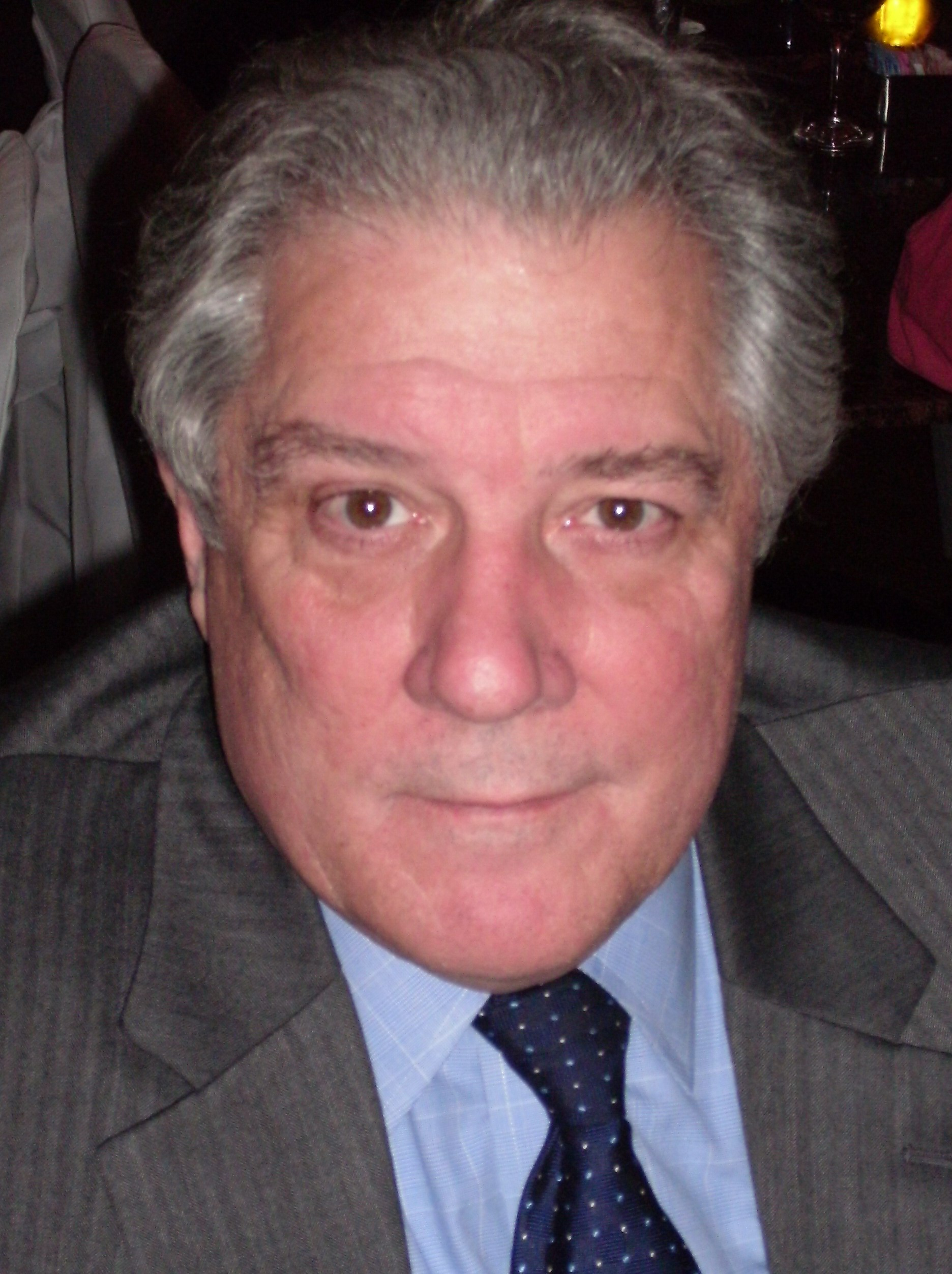
- Hagan in 2009

Member of the Cuyahoga County Board of Commissioners
- In office 2004–2011
- Preceded by: Tim McCormack
- Succeeded by: Position abolished
- In office 1982–1998
- Preceded by: Ed Feighan
- Succeeded by: Jimmy Dimora

Personal details
- Born: March 18, 1946 (age 80) Youngstown, Ohio, U.S.
- Party: Democratic
- Spouses: Jeanne Carney (m. 1973; div. 1995) Kate Mulgrew (m. 1999; div. 2014)
- Children: 2
- Parent: Robert E. Hagan
- Education: Youngstown State University (BA); Cleveland State University (MUP)

Timothy Hagan (born March 18, 1946) is an American politician who served as Cuyahoga County Commissioner and other local offices from the 1980s through 2000s, and was his party's nominee for the governorship of Ohio in 2002.

== Early life ==
Hagan was born and grew up in Youngstown, Ohio, as one of fourteen siblings (including a twin brother, James). Hagan's father, Robert Hagan, was a Trumbull County Commissioner and, later, a State Representative. After graduating from Ursuline High School, Hagan attended Youngstown State University (then known as Youngstown State College). He was drafted for military service during the Vietnam War and served in Germany in the late 1960s. After leaving the military, he worked as a baker and steelworker in Youngstown before going on to earn a degree in urban studies from the Maxine Goodman Levin College of Urban Affairs at Cleveland State University in 1975. He then worked as a social worker in Youngstown.

== Political career ==
In 1978, Hagan became chairman of the Cuyahoga County Democratic Party, beating Garfield Heights ward leader Henry S. Trubiano. In that position, he became one of the first Democrats to endorse Edward M. Kennedy in the 1980 presidential election over the sitting Democratic President Jimmy Carter. Prior to his endorsement, Hagan had been a guest of Kennedy at his home in Hyannisport.

Hagan was appointed Cuyahoga County's county recorder, but he failed to keep the seat in an election. He then ran for a seat on the Cuyahoga County board of commissioners, losing to Republican Virgil Brown. He ran again in 1981, this time successfully. Hagan served on the county commission for 16 years (1982–1998).

In 1989, Hagan made an unsuccessful attempt for the office of mayor of Cleveland, losing the Democratic primary to Ohio State Senator Michael R. White, who went on to defeat Cleveland City Council President George L. Forbes in the general election. In 1992, with White's endorsement, Hagan made an unsuccessful bid for a seat in the U.S. House of Representatives, losing in the Democratic primary to incumbent U.S. Rep. Mary Rose Oakar.

Hagan described himself as an avowed liberal, ingrained by his father's politics, and expressed regret at the conservative trend in the Democratic Party in the 1990s. He was known to quote Albert Camus in his speeches, a habit that did not earn him the affection of blue-collar voters. However, he allowed for compromises with his innate liberalism, agreeing to go along with government funding for the Cleveland Gateway project, which included the construction of Jacobs Field and Gund Arena.

Hagan has received praise from both sides of the political aisle. Republican Jim Petro, the state auditor and former fellow county commissioner, called him "the most honorable politician I've ever known". He even earned the friendship of former rival Forbes, who, during the 1989 election, had described Hagan as a "pimp".

Hagan ran into political trouble when it was revealed that Cuyahoga County Treasurer Francis E. Gaul (famous for saying that "Most people in Cleveland think Camus is the whale at SeaWorld," in reference to Hagan) had made risky investments using county funds, having assured the Board of Commissioners that the Secured Assets Fund Earnings fund was free of risk. Hagan was called as a witness for the defense in Gaul's trial, saying that he had "implicitly" trusted Gaul's reassurances that the investments were safe.

It was 1994, however, and the booming economy mitigated the county treasury's losses and Hagan managed to win re-election to the board of commissioners.

In 1996, Hagan announced that he would retire from electoral politics after his term expired at the end of 1998, stating: "I'm in the twilight of a mediocre career. But I'm looking forward to going to the grocery store without someone asking me for a job."

In 2002, he ran for the office of Governor of Ohio and lost to the incumbent Republican, Robert A. Taft III. Hagan's campaign against Taft using a duck quacking "Taftquack" raised trademark issues with the American Family Life Insurance Company's trademarked "AFLAC" quacking duck. The federal court in the Northern District of Ohio found that Hagan's commercial neither infringed nor diluted the AFLAC mark. 266 F. Supp. 2d 682.

In February 2004, Hagan announced his intention to run again for a seat on the Cuyahoga County commission against fellow Democrat and former colleague, Tim McCormack. Hagan easily defeated McCormack in the Democratic primary election and faced no Republican opposition in the November 2004 general election. In November 2008, he was re-elected to the Cuyahoga County commission without opposition.

In November 2009, the voters of Cuyahoga County voted to change its governmental structure. Hagan retired as Cuyahoga County Commissioner in 2011, when the county switched to an Executive-Council form of government.

== Personal life ==
Mulgrew and Hagan

In 1973, Hagan married Jeanne Marie Carney. Carney's father, John Carney, a successful property developer and later judge, helped Hagan to get his start in Democratic politics in his brother James Carney's 1971 campaign for mayor of Cleveland. They had two daughters, Eleanor and Marie. They divorced in 1995. In 1999, Hagan married actress Kate Mulgrew. As of 2014, they had divorced.

Hagan has a close relationship with members of the Kennedy family—he is a godfather to Katherine Kennedy Townsend, one of Robert F. Kennedy's grandchildren, and was a pallbearer at the funeral of Stephen E. Smith, the late husband of Jean Kennedy Smith.

Hagan's father, Robert E. Hagan, served as a county commissioner on the board of commissioners of Trumbull County, Ohio, and in the Ohio General Assembly. Hagan's brother Robert F. Hagan was a member of the Ohio House of Representatives.

== See also ==
- Ohio gubernatorial elections

Party political offices
Preceded by Lee Fisher	Democratic nominee for Governor of Ohio; 2002	Succeeded by Ted Strickland
