= Gateway Plaza =

Gateway Plaza may refer to:

- A component of the Gateway Sports and Entertainment Complex in Cleveland, Ohio, United States
- Gateway Plaza (Zhubei), a skyscraper complex in Zhubei, Hsinchu County, Taiwan
