= Thomas V. Chema =

American academic administrator (1946–2025)

Thomas Chema

21st President of Hiram College
- In office 2003–2013
- Preceded by: Richard J. Scaldini
- Succeeded by: Lori E. Varlotta

Personal details
- Born: October 31, 1946 East Liverpool, Ohio, U.S.
- Died: March 16, 2025 (aged 78) Hiram, Ohio, U.S
- Education: University of Notre Dame (BA); Harvard University (JD)

Thomas V. Chema (October 31, 1946 – March 16, 2025) was an American academic administrator and attorney. Chema served as the 21st President of Hiram College from 2004 to 2013. Prior to becoming president of Hiram, Chema spent more than 30 years in business, government, and law.

== Early life and education ==
Chema was born on October 31, 1946. A native of East Liverpool, Ohio, he earned a Bachelor of Arts degree from the University of Notre Dame and Juris Doctor from Harvard Law School.

== Career ==
Chema began his career with the Cleveland-based law firm of Arter & Hadden in 1971 and became a partner in 1979. He took a leave of absence in 1983 to serve as Executive Director of the Ohio Lottery. In 1985, became Chairman of the Public Utilities Commission of Ohio.

He also served in a number of national higher education associations including the Council of Independent Colleges, the National Association of Independent Colleges and Universities, the Annapolis Group, and with Ohio-based organizations such as the Association of Independent Colleges and Universities of Ohio, the North Coast Athletic Conference, and the Ohio Foundation of Independent Colleges.

In 1990, he was appointed executive director of the Gateway Sports and Entertainment Complex and was responsible for overseeing the public-private partnership that led to the financing and construction of Progressive Field and Rocket Mortgage FieldHouse in Cleveland. He then resumed his law practice and in recent years has consulted across the country on sports and entertainment-related economic development projects as President of Gateway Consultants Group.

Chema is recognized as an expert on energy and telecommunications economics and regulation, infrastructure planning, and developing public-private partnerships. He has published numerous articles on these topics and frequently lectured throughout the country, including assignments at the Harvard Graduate School of Design.

== Death ==
Thomas V. Chema died at his home in Downtown Cleveland, on March 16, 2025, at the age of 78.

== Sources ==
- Delaney, Kevin J.; Eckstein, Rick (2003). Public Dollars, Private Stadiums: The Battle Over Building Sports Stadiums. Rutgers University Press. ISBN 978-0-8135-3343-8.
