= 2002 Ohio gubernatorial election =

- November 5, 2002
- Turnout: 47.18% (registered voters) ▼2.63pp
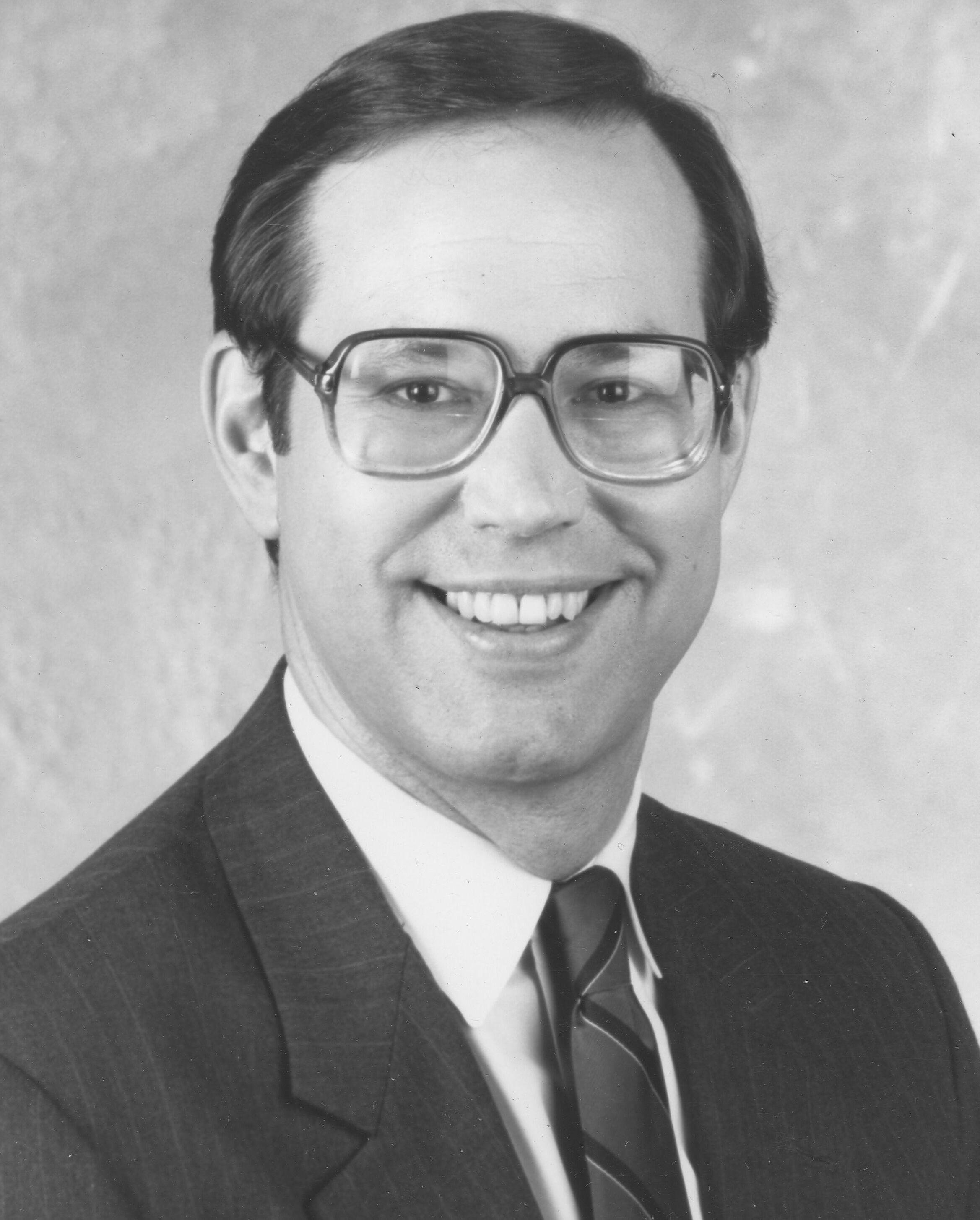

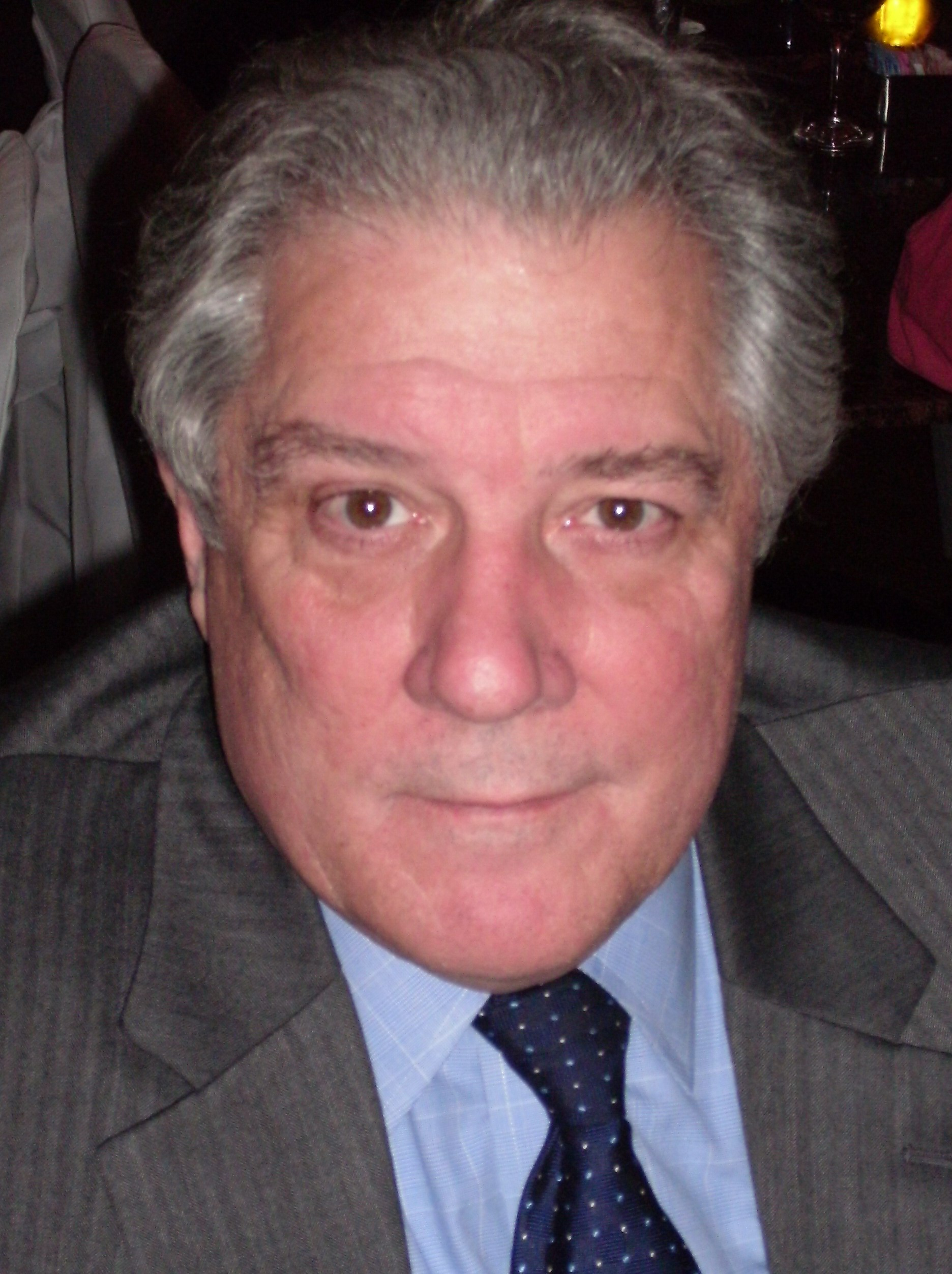
Nominee	Bob Taft	Tim Hagan
Party	Republican	Democratic
Running mate	Jennette Bradley	Charleta Tavares
Popular vote	1,865,007	1,236,924
Percentage	57.76%	38.31%
- County results Taft: 40–50% 50–60% 60–70% 70–80% Hagan: 40–50% 50–60%
Governor before election
Bob Taft
Republican
Elected Governor
Bob Taft
Republican

The 2002 Ohio gubernatorial election took place on November 5, 2002. Incumbent Republican Governor of Ohio Bob Taft ran for a second and final term as governor. He was opposed by Democratic nominee Tim Hagan, a former Cuyahoga County commissioner. The race between Taft and Hagan was not competitive; Taft was re-elected by a substantial margin.

== Democratic primary ==
=== Candidates ===
- Tim Hagan, former Cuyahoga County commissioner and candidate for Cleveland mayor in 1989

=== Declined ===
- Sherrod Brown, U.S. representative from Ohio's 13th congressional district since 1993, Ohio secretary of state 1983-1991
- Richard Celeste, U.S. ambassador to India 1997–2001, former governor of Ohio 1983-1991

Sherrod Brown's district was seen as particularly vulnerable in redistricting, and many thought he would run for governor. Brown ultimately did not pursue a race, and went on to win in a redrawn 13th district. Tim Hagan, a former Cuyahoga County commissioner, had initially dithered on running, indicating a willingness to defer to a more prominent nominee, should one emerge. As none emerged, Hagan became the Democratic nominee.

=== Results ===
Democratic primary results
Party	Candidate	Votes	%
Democratic	Tim Hagan	467,572	100.00
Total votes		467,572	100.00

== Republican primary ==
=== Candidates ===
- Bob Taft, incumbent governor of Ohio

=== Results ===
Republican primary results
Party	Candidate	Votes	%
Republican	Bob Taft (incumbent)	552,491	100.00
Total votes		552,491	100.00

== General election ==
Taft was the favorite, and Hagan struggled with fundraising. Hagan, who was married to Star Trek actress Kate Mulgrew, held a fundraiser with her and William Shatner. Hagan still struggled, and had to pull TV ads and focus on mail ads.

=== Predictions ===
Source	Ranking	As of
The Cook Political Report	Safe R	October 31, 2002
Sabato's Crystal Ball	Likely R	November 4, 2002

=== Polling ===
Poll source	Date(s) administered	Sample size (Note: Key: A – all adults RV – registered voters LV – likely voters V – unclear)	Margin of error	Bob Taft (R)	Tim Hagan (D)	Other / Undecided
SurveyUSA	October 29–31, 2002	725 (LV)	± 3.8%	57%	39%	3%

=== Results ===
Taft won reelection easily, winning by nearly 19.5% and by 628,083 votes. He did well in most parts of the state. Hagan only managed to win six out of 88 counties. He won Lorain County, Cuyahoga County, Summit County, Trumbull County, Mahoning County, and Athens County. Despite winning in a landslide,

Taft would go on to be extremely unpopular in his second term, leaving office with a 2% approval rating, the lowest for any statewide official in modern U.S. history.

In 2006, Democrat Ted Strickland would easily defeat Republican Ohio Secretary of State Ken Blackwell. This resulted in a gain for the Democrats, and was the first time they had obtained the governorship in 16 years.

Ohio gubernatorial election, 2002
Party	Candidate	Votes	%	±%
Republican	Bob Taft (incumbent)	1,865,007	57.76%	+7.71%
Democratic	Tim Hagan	1,236,924	38.31%	−6.38%
Independent	John Eastman	126,686	3.92%	
Write-ins		375	0.01%	
Majority		628,083	19.45%	+14.09%
Turnout		3,228,992		
Republican hold		Swing		

=== By county ===
County	Bob Taft Republican		Tim Hagan Democratic		Various candidates Other parties		Margin		Total votes cast
County	#	%	#	%	#	%	#	%	Total votes cast
Adams	4,296	63.41%	2,177	32.13%	302	4.46%	2,119	31.28%	6,775
Allen	19,226	64.73%	8,581	28.89%	1,893	6.38%	10,645	35.84%	29,700
Ashland	9,894	65.80%	4,607	30.64%	536	3.56%	5,287	35.16%	15,037
Ashtabula	14,825	54.12%	11,472	41.88%	1,098	4.00%	3,353	12.24%	27,395
Athens	7,018	42.91%	8,408	51.40%	931	5.69%	-1,390	-8.49%	16,357
Auglaize	9,559	70.84%	3,096	22.94%	839	6.22%	6,463	47.90%	13,494
Belmont	10,299	49.89%	9,492	45.98%	852	4.13%	807	3.91%	20,643
Brown	7,881	68.23%	3,181	27.54%	488	4.23%	4,700	40.69%	11,550
Butler	62,076	71.63%	20,896	24.11%	3,691	4.26%	41,180	47.52%	86,663
Carroll	5,254	60.03%	3,104	35.46%	395	4.51%	2,150	24.57%	8,753
Champaign	7,067	66.64%	2,880	27.16%	658	6.20%	4,187	39.48%	10,605
Clark	22,846	60.89%	12,398	33.04%	2,278	6.07%	10,448	27.85%	37,522
Clermont	31,723	74.75%	9,073	21.38%	1,644	3.87%	22,650	53.37%	42,440
Clinton	7,321	71.27%	2,463	23.98%	488	4.75%	4,858	47.29%	10,272
Columbiana	18,245	59.01%	11,419	36.93%	1,253	4.06%	6,826	22.08%	30,917
Coshocton	6,881	66.57%	2,948	28.52%	508	4.91%	3,933	38.05%	10,337
Crawford	8,676	65.95%	3,859	29.33%	620	4.72%	4,817	36.62%	13,155
Cuyahoga	142,874	37.70%	225,582	59.53%	10,496	2.77%	-82,708	-21.83%	378,952
Darke	12,310	70.52%	4,216	24.15%	930	5.33%	8,094	46.37%	17,456
Defiance	7,049	66.21%	3,225	30.29%	372	3.50%	3,824	35.92%	10,646
Delaware	28,200	71.94%	9,226	23.54%	1,773	4.52%	18,974	48.40%	39,199
Erie	13,656	54.70%	10,673	42.75%	636	2.55%	2,983	11.95%	24,965
Fairfield	26,256	67.51%	10,531	27.08%	2,106	5.41%	15,725	40.43%	38,893
Fayette	4,385	67.30%	1,807	27.73%	324	4.97%	2,578	39.57%	6,516
Franklin	156,712	56.57%	108,778	39.27%	11,512	4.16%	47,934	17.30%	277,002
Fulton	9,600	73.80%	2,995	23.02%	413	3.18%	6,605	50.78%	13,008
Gallia	6,057	65.54%	2,759	29.85%	426	4.61%	3,298	35.69%	9,242
Geauga	19,768	61.41%	11,458	35.59%	964	3.00%	8,310	25.82%	32,190
Greene	28,815	67.22%	11,780	27.48%	2,269	5.30%	17,035	39.74%	42,864
Guernsey	6,348	58.53%	4,042	37.27%	456	4.20%	2,306	21.26%	10,846
Hamilton	160,223	65.84%	73,843	30.34%	9,279	3.82%	86,380	35.50%	243,345
Hancock	15,757	76.52%	4,151	20.16%	685	3.32%	11,606	56.36%	20,593
Hardin	5,153	61.44%	2,829	33.73%	405	4.83%	2,324	27.71%	8,387
Harrison	3,141	54.85%	2,327	40.77%	250	4.38%	804	14.08%	5,708
Henry	6,814	74.42%	2,069	22.60%	273	2.98%	4,745	51.82%	9,156
Highland	7,426	67.88%	2,992	27.35%	522	4.77%	4,434	40.53%	10,940
Hocking	4,188	55.14%	2,881	37.93%	526	6.93%	1,307	17.21%	7,595
Holmes	4,552	73.51%	1,429	23.08%	211	3.41%	3,123	50.43%	6,192
Huron	9,993	65.77%	4,673	30.76%	528	3.47%	5,320	35.01%	15,194
Jackson	5,531	62.29%	2,893	32.58%	456	5.13%	2,638	29.71%	8,880
Jefferson	12,983	56.19%	9,206	39.85%	915	3.96%	3,777	16.34%	23,104
Knox	9,291	65.27%	4,166	29.27%	777	5.46%	5,125	36.00%	14,234
Lake	37,986	56.60%	27,370	40.78%	1,757	2.62%	10,616	15.82%	67,113
Lawrence	9,458	61.07%	5,495	35.48%	533	3.45%	3,963	25.59%	15,486
Licking	32,118	68.08%	12,653	26.82%	2,408	5.10%	19,465	41.26%	47,179
Logan	8,996	71.50%	2,891	22.98%	695	5.52%	6,105	48.52%	12,582
Lorain	37,423	47.69%	38,515	49.08%	2,528	3.23%	-1,092	-1.39%	78,466
Lucas	76,572	59.14%	49,648	38.34%	3,266	2.52%	26,924	20.80%	129,486
Madison	6,947	66.00%	2,932	27.85%	647	6.15%	4,015	38.15%	10,526
Mahoning	40,149	46.15%	43,110	49.55%	3,741	4.30%	-2,961	-3.40%	87,000
Marion	10,582	61.20%	5,704	32.99%	1,006	5.81%	4,878	28.21%	17,292
Medina	27,436	58.31%	17,998	38.25%	1,614	3.44%	9,438	20.06%	47,048
Meigs	4,517	65.56%	1,970	28.59%	403	5.85%	2,547	36.97%	6,890
Mercer	11,001	74.16%	3,237	21.82%	596	4.02%	7,764	52.34%	14,834
Miami	20,743	70.12%	7,297	24.67%	1,542	5.21%	13,446	45.45%	29,582
Monroe	2,482	48.81%	2,421	47.61%	182	3.58%	61	1.20%	5,085
Montgomery	95,891	59.46%	59,584	36.94%	5,808	3.60%	36,307	22.52%	161,283
Morgan	2,975	64.20%	1,378	29.74%	281	6.06%	1,597	34.46%	4,634
Morrow	6,093	63.65%	2,799	29.24%	681	7.11%	3,294	34.41%	9,573
Muskingum	14,990	66.82%	6,279	27.99%	1,164	5.19%	8,711	38.83%	22,433
Noble	2,438	56.92%	1,628	38.01%	217	5.07%	810	18.91%	4,283
Ottawa	9,428	62.98%	5,073	33.89%	470	3.13%	4,355	29.09%	14,971
Paulding	3,972	64.41%	1,939	31.44%	256	4.15%	2,033	32.97%	6,167
Perry	5,102	56.29%	3,422	37.75%	540	5.96%	1,680	18.54%	9,064
Pickaway	7,432	62.54%	3,775	31.77%	676	5.69%	3,657	30.77%	11,883
Pike	4,046	52.50%	3,377	43.82%	284	3.68%	669	8.68%	7,707
Portage	19,887	47.89%	19,708	47.45%	1,935	4.66%	179	0.44%	41,530
Preble	7,832	67.25%	3,112	26.72%	702	6.03%	4,720	40.53%	11,646
Putnam	8,592	69.72%	3,110	25.24%	621	5.04%	5,482	44.48%	12,323
Richland	21,963	59.66%	13,520	36.73%	1,328	3.61%	8,443	22.93%	36,811
Ross	10,871	59.37%	6,714	36.67%	725	3.96%	4,157	22.70%	18,310
Sandusky	12,187	64.03%	6,149	32.31%	696	3.66%	6,038	31.72%	19,032
Scioto	12,161	55.67%	8,867	40.59%	817	3.74%	3,294	15.08%	21,845
Seneca	11,101	66.81%	4,780	28.77%	735	4.42%	6,321	38.04%	16,616
Shelby	10,190	68.90%	3,812	25.78%	787	5.32%	6,378	43.12%	14,789
Stark	64,932	56.72%	44,840	39.17%	4,711	4.11%	20,092	17.55%	114,483
Summit	75,340	47.31%	77,928	48.94%	5,978	3.75%	-2,588	-1.63%	159,246
Trumbull	33,718	47.03%	35,364	49.33%	2,613	3.64%	-1,646	-2.30%	71,695
Tuscarawas	13,457	53.63%	10,639	42.40%	994	3.97%	2,818	11.23%	25,090
Union	8,631	71.22%	2,723	22.47%	764	6.31%	5,908	48.75%	12,118
Van Wert	6,561	72.52%	2,085	23.05%	401	4.43%	4,476	49.47%	9,047
Vinton	2,135	56.29%	1,448	38.18%	210	5.53%	687	18.11%	4,296
Warren	37,388	76.04%	9,833	20.00%	1,947	3.96%	27,555	56.04%	49,168
Washington	11,499	62.93%	6,045	33.08%	730	3.99%	5,454	29.85%	18,274
Wayne	20,340	66.66%	9,061	29.69%	1,113	3.65%	11,279	36.97%	30,514
Williams	7,731	69.08%	2,967	26.51%	494	4.41%	4,764	42.57%	11,192
Wood	25,172	66.44%	11,521	30.41%	1,194	3.15%	13,651	36.03%	37,887
Wyandot	4,383	69.64%	1,618	25.71%	293	4.65%	2,765	43.93%	6,294
Totals	1,865,007	57.76%	1,236,924	38.31%	127,061	3.93%	628,083	19.45%	3,228,992

==== Counties that flipped from Democratic to Republican ====
- Montgomery (largest city: Dayton)
- Monroe (largest city: Woodsfield)
- Portage (largest city: Kent)
- Lucas (largest city: Toledo)
- Erie (largest city: Sandusky)
- Belmont (largest city: Martins Ferry)
- Jefferson (largest city: Steubenville)
- Tuscarawas (largest city: New Philadelphia)
- Harrison (largest city: Cadiz)
- Perry (largest city: New Lexington)
- Pike (largest city: Waverly)
- Ross (largest city: Chillicothe)
- Scioto (largest city: Portsmouth)
- Vinton (largest city: McArthur)
