= Michael R. White (politician) =

American politician

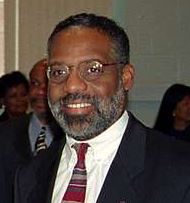
- White in 2009

55th Mayor of Cleveland
- In office January 1, 1990 – January 1, 2002
- Preceded by: George Voinovich
- Succeeded by: Jane L. Campbell

Member of the Ohio Senate from the 21st district
- In office May 17, 1984 – December 31, 1989
- Preceded by: Morris Jackson
- Succeeded by: Jeff Johnson

Personal details
- Born: August 13, 1951 (age 75) Cleveland, Ohio, U.S.
- Party: Democratic
- Education: Ohio State University

Michael White (born August 13, 1951) is an American politician of the Democratic Party and was the 55th and second longest-serving mayor of Cleveland, Ohio encompassing three four-year terms, from 1990 to 2002. He was Cleveland's second African American mayor as well as the city's second youngest mayor.

== Early career ==
White, who grew up in Cleveland's Glenville neighborhood, began his political career early on during his college years at Ohio State University, when he protested against the discriminatory policies of the Columbus public bus system and was subsequently arrested. White ran the following year for Student Union president and won, becoming the college's first black student body leader. He earned a Bachelor of Arts degree in 1973 and a Master of Public Administration degree in 1974.

After college, White returned to Cleveland. He served from 1976 to 1977 as an administrative assistant to the Cleveland City Council and then served as city councilman from the Glenville area from 1978 to 1984. During his time on the City Council, White became a prominent protégé of Councilman George L. Forbes. White then represented the area's 21st District in the Ohio Senate, serving as a Democratic assistant minority whip.

== Mayoralty ==
In 1989, White entered the heavily contested race for mayor of Cleveland, along with several other notable candidates including Forbes, Ralph J. Perk Jr. (the son of former Cleveland mayor Ralph J. Perk), Benny Bonanno (Clerk of the Cleveland Municipal Court), and Tim Hagan (Cuyahoga County commissioner). Out of all the candidates, Forbes and White made it to the general election. It was the first time two Black candidates emerged as the number one and two contenders in a primary election in Cleveland history.

In Cleveland, incumbent Mike White won re-election against council president George Forbes, who ran as the candidate of black power and the public sector unions. Angering the unions by eliminating some of the city's exotic work rules, White presented himself as pro-business, pro-police and an effective manager above all, arguing that "jobs were the cure for the 'addiction to the mailbox,'" referring to welfare checks.

White ended up winning the race, securing "81% of the vote in predominantly white wards and 30% in the predominantly black wards where his opponent, George Forbes, was the strongest." He was subsequently re-elected mayor in 1993 and 1997.

He cameoed as himself on The Drew Carey Show, in the season 2 episode titled "Drewstock" which aired in January 1997.

Some of White's accomplishments in office include passing legislation making banks dispel lending policies that were restrictive to minorities, providing leadership for retaining a Cleveland Browns team in the NFL (after then-Browns team owner Art Modell moved to Baltimore with all former Browns players and personnel to form the Baltimore Ravens) as well as building a new stadium for the Cleveland Browns, and construction of the Gateway stadium development. He also declared October 30, 1994 "Bone Thugs~N~Harmony Day" in the city of Cleveland to honor the hometown rappers.

White is also credited in saving the Continental Airlines Cleveland Hub. In 1999, Clevelanders and Northeast Ohioans celebrated direct access to London, England with a nonstop air service from Cleveland Hopkins International Airport CLE to London's Gatwick LGW. This flight was popular with Cleveland's business community and helped Clevelanders bypass the traditional Cleveland-NYC-London connections. Continental ended nonstop London flights in 2009. Continental Airlines in 1997 opened a new Gate D at Hopkins Airport.

Under Mayor White's tenure, Cleveland became a tourist spot with the openings of the Rock and Roll Hall of Fame (1995) and the Great Lakes Science Center (1996).

White announced at an informal appearance at Miles Standish Elementary School on April 23, 2001 that he would not seek a fourth term as mayor. When White's successor, Jane L. Campbell, assumed office in January 2002, the former mayor retired to an alpaca farm near Newcomerstown, Ohio. In 2012, he was also running the Yellow Butterfly Winery near the same town.

== Controversy ==
The White administration was criticized for ignoring or at least underachieving in its aid to residents of the predominantly black neighborhoods. For instance, there was lackluster job training efforts, and it directed none of the enterprise zone development projects to the Hough neighborhood.

Two of White's closest associates, Nate Gray and Ricardo Teamor, were convicted and sentenced to prison in connection with bribery scandals. Gray was sentenced to fifteen years in prison for racketeering and extortion; an FBI affidavit depicted Gray as a "bag man" who engaged in a shakedown of city contractors. Teamor pleaded guilty to bribery to former Councilman Joe Jones and cooperated with federal prosecutors, revealing details of corruption in the Cleveland Hopkins International Airport expansion project, which was undertaken when White was mayor. White was targeted in the federal probe of corruption in Cleveland but was never charged with any crime.

== Personal life ==
Michael White married Tamera Norris in Zanesville, Ohio in December 1987. They had two children. They were divorced in November 1995.

He married JoAnn Boscia, former Lakewood City Council president, in March 1998. He and JoAnn ran Seven Pines Alpacas and the Yellow Buttery Winery in Newcomerstown, Ohio from 2008 to 2024. They sold the winery and alpaca farm in 2024. White and JoAnn divorced in 2024, and he moved back to Cleveland.

He currently works for the Mandel Foundation as director of the Neighborhood Leadership Development and Community Development Corporation Leadership Program.

Political offices
Preceded by George V. Voinovich	Mayor of Cleveland; 1990–2002	Succeeded by Jane L. Campbell
