= MHM =

MHM may refer to:

== Organisations ==
- Maritime Heritage Minnesota, historical society
- Mayer Hoffman McCann P.C., US accountancy firm
- Mill Hill Missionaries, a society of apostolic life of Catholic missionaries
- Our Homeland Movement (Mi Hazánk Mozgalom), a Hungarian political party

== Other uses ==
- Master of Health Administration, also known as Master of Health Management
- Melbourne Holocaust Museum, a museum dedicated to the Holocaust in Melbourne, Australia
- Menstrual hygiene management, access to facilities and products to manage menstruation
- Merstham railway station, Surrey, England, by National Rail station code
- "Mhm", a song by Vince Staples from the album Vince Staples

== See also ==
- Habitation and Logistics Outpost, a space station module also known as the Minimum Habitation Module (MHM)
