= Garofoli =

Garofoli is a surname of Italian origin. People with that name include:

- Anthony Garofoli (1936–2003), American lawyer and politician
- Gianmarco Garofoli (born 2002), Italian cyclist
- Roberto Garofoli (born 1966), Italian magistrate and civil servant
