= Michael DeGroote =

Canadian businessman (1933–2022)

Michael DeGroote OC
- Born: August 13, 1933; West Flanders, Belgium
- Died: September 12, 2022 (aged 89)

Michael George DeGroote OC (August 13, 1933 – September 12, 2022) was a Canadian businessman and philanthropist from Hamilton, Ontario, who resided in Bermuda. Aside from his business career, he was best known as a major private donor to local educational institutions including McMaster University, McMaster University Medical School, and Hillfield Strathallan College.

== Early life ==
DeGroote was born in West Flanders, Belgium, on August 13, 1933. He immigrated to Canada with his family in 1948, when he was 14 years old. He dropped out of school in ninth grade to help his family by working in the tobacco fields near Tillsonburg, Ontario. He subsequently purchased a former army truck when he was 18 and used it to transport manure to those fields.

== Business career ==
DeGroote first purchased Laidlaw Transport Ltd., a small trucking company based in Hagersville, Ontario, in 1959. Under his direction, the company expanded past trucking by entering the solid waste and school bus industries. It eventually became the largest school-bus company and third-largest waste-management company in North America. By the mid 1970s Laidlaw was a large and successful business, and DeGroote had personally become wealthy enough to purchase the Hamilton Tiger-Cats of the Canadian Football League in 1974. He sold the team four years later, and was the last owner of the Tiger-Cats to make a profit from the franchise until 2015.

In March 1988, DeGroote sold his Laidlaw shares to Canadian Pacific. In return, he received a combination of cash and CP shares worth $499 million. He then retired to Bermuda two years later. However, controversy followed him after his departure as director. In August 1992, Laidlaw paid $7.65 million to settle a class action lawsuit which had alleged that Laidlaw's corporate officers had "misrepresented the financial condition of Laidlaw". DeGroote also paid $23 million to the Ontario Securities Commission to settle a claim regarding insider trading of Laidlaw stock.

Though still residing in Bermuda, DeGroote was involved in a number of business ventures after his retirement, such as Republic Waste, AutoNation, NRX Global Inc and Century Business Services. His business dealings in the Dominican Republic was the subject of CBC's The Fifth Estate episode "The Mob and Michael DeGroote" which aired January 23, 2015. It found that members of the Montreal Mafia tried to take over the Dominican casinos co-owned by DeGroote by force. DeGroote maintained that he did not collude with organized crime that had become entangled in the financial squabble.

== Personal life ==
DeGroote had four children: Michael Jr., Gary, Joni, and Tim.

DeGroote suffered a stroke in 2001, which restricted his activities. He died on September 12, 2022, at age 89.

== Awards and philanthropy ==
DeGroote was appointed an officer of the Order of Canada in October 1990 and invested six months later in April of the following year. He had earlier made a major donation to McMaster University in 1987, which funded the construction of a new business school. It was later renamed the Michael G. DeGroote School of Business in his honour in 1992. He was granted an honorary doctorate from McMaster that same year.

Almost a decade later, DeGroote donated $105 million to McMaster that funded a number of medical research centres as well as the Michael G. DeGroote Centre for Learning and Discovery (commonly abbreviated as MDCL to avoid confusion with the DeGroote School of Business). In addition, the McMaster School of Medicine was renamed to the Michael G. DeGroote School of Medicine at McMaster in 2004. DeGroote consequently became the first benefactor in Canada to have a medical building renamed in his honour, having earlier been the first donor in Ontario to have a business school named after him.

DeGroote gave $10.5 million to Hillfield Strathallan College in 2009. This added to existing funds for the planned campus restructuring and the new Senior School building which bore his name. He was consequently made an honorary member of the college's 2009 graduating class. Five years later, at the McMaster University Michael G. DeGroote School of Medicine graduation ceremony, DeGroote took the stage to announce a gift of $50 million to support increased focus on national and international health leadership, including developing stronger ties with McMaster's DeGroote School of Business as well as partnerships that focus on biomedical advances. Additionally, a new fund was created to seed new medical research within the Faculty of Health Sciences.
