= CBIZ =

US professional services company

CBIZ, Inc.
- Formerly: Stout Environmental, Inc. (1987); International Alliance Services, Inc. (1996); Century Business Services, Inc. (1997)
- Type: Public
- Traded as: NYSE: CBZ (Class A); S&P 500 component
- ISIN: IE00B4BNMY34
- Industry: Professional services; Business services
- Founded: 1987; 39 years ago
- Headquarters: Independence, Ohio
- Key people: Jerome Grisko (President and CEO)
- Revenue: ▲US$2.76 billion (2025)
- Operating income: ▲US$234 million (2025)
- Net income: ▲US$115 million (2025)
- Total assets: ▲US$4.41 billion (2025)
- Total equity: ▲US$1.76 billion (2025)
- Number of employees: 9,500 (2025)
- Website: www.cbiz.com

CBIZ, Inc. is a national provider of financial, insurance and advisory services headquartered in Independence, Ohio. CBIZ is one of the largest accounting, insurance brokerage, financial and advisory services providers in the United States with more than 120 offices and nearly 7,000 employees. Its common stock has been traded on the New York Stock Exchange since 1996, under the symbol "CBZ" since 1997.

Following its 2024 acquisition of Marcum LLP, CBIZ became the 7th largest accounting firm in the United States by total revenue.

In July 2026, it was announced that Grant Thornton Advisors LLC, with financial support from New Mountain Capital, had entered into a definitive agreement to acquire CBIZ in an all-cash transaction with an enterprise value of $5 billion.

== History ==
In 1987, Stout Environmental, Inc. ("Stout") was formed as a Delaware corporation. It was acquired by Republic Industries in 1992. In April 1995, Republic Industries spun off the business into an entity known as Republic Environmental Systems, which was merged with Century Surety Company (which was part of Alliance Holding Corporation) into a newly formed entity, International Alliance Services, Inc. (Nasdaq: IASI) in October 1996. In 1997, IASI sold its environmental services operations and changed its name to Century Business Services, Inc. (NYSE: CBZ) in December 1997. In 1998, Century Business acquired Beall Garner Screen & Geare Inc., one of the largest privately owned insurance agencies in the United States (formerly run by U.S. Senator J. Glenn Beall Jr.). The company changed its name to CBIZ, Inc. in August 2005.

In 1998, Century Business Services, Inc. (later renamed CBIZ) expanded its investment banking and middle-market advisory presence by acquiring the boutique investment banking firm Niederhoffer-Henkel & Co. The acquired firm had been co-founded and previously led by statistician and hedge fund manager Victor Niederhoffer, who served as its CEO and chairman. Following the acquisition, the business unit operated as a subsidiary of the parent corporation. The practice was subsequently rebranded as the Century Capital Group, before being integrated into the CBIZ M&A Group.

Since 1998, CBIZ and CBIZ CPAs (formerly known as Mayer Hoffman McCann P.C.) have operated an alternative practice structure in which they act as separate, independent legal entities that work together to provide accounting services to clients, sharing a tax and consulting practice, CBIZ MHM LLC, which is a division of CBIZ.

=== Services and operations ===
The business is organized into three practice groups:

- Financial Services: comprising core accounting services including traditional accounting, tax compliance, advisory, and specialty services, like transaction and risk advisory services, litigation support, valuation, and federal and state government health care compliance and consulting.
- Benefits and Insurance Services: provides brokerage and consulting expertise for group health benefits and property and casualty insurance in addition to retirement plan advisory and investment services, payroll, human capital management, and other related services.
- National Practices: information technology focusing on managed networking and hardware services and healthcare consulting.

=== Acquisitions ===
- 2022: Marks Paneth LLP, Stinnett & Associates, LLC.
- 2023: Danenhauer and Danenhauer, Inc., Somerset CPAs and Advisors, Pivot Point Security, Ickovic and Co. PC, and American Pension Advisors, Ltd.
- 2024: Erickson, Brown & Kloster, CompuData, Inc., Marcum LLP.
- 2026: BINDZ Consulting Private Limited.

=== Notable people ===
- Ed Feighan (former U.S. Representative from Ohio)
- Wayne Huizenga (founded AutoNation and Waste Management Inc.)
- Michael DeGroote (Canadian businessman)
- Joel Kramer (former professional basketball player)

== See also ==
- CBIZ CPAs
