= Robert E. Hagan =

American politician (1921–1999)

Member of the Ohio House of Representatives from the 61st district
- In office January 5, 1983-December 31, 1988
- Preceded by: Relocated from Cuyahoga County
- Succeeded by: Ray Sines

Personal details
- Born: Robert Emmet Hagan
- Party: Democratic
- Children: Tim Hagan

Robert Emmet Hagan (March 22, 1921 – January 17, 1999) was an American politician of the Democratic Party.

Hagan was an ironworker in Youngstown and served as a county commissioner in Trumbull County, Ohio, before being elected to the Ohio General Assembly in the district of his adopted hometown of Madison, Ohio. During his three terms in the legislature, 1983–1989, he was known as the assembly's most liberal member. During that period, Hagan's son, Robert F. Hagan, also held a seat in the Ohio House of Representatives.

In 1970, Hagan ran unsuccessfully for the Democratic nomination for Lieutenant Governor of Ohio. In 1972, Hagan was on the traveling staff of Democratic nominee for Vice President Sargent Shriver as his joke writer.

Throughout his career Hagan was known for a forceful speaking style that often included a fair share of humor. After leaving elected office, Hagan began performing stand-up comedy, having fun with politics and the unusually large size of his family (he and his wife, Ada DiLoreto Hagan, had 14 children), among other topics. He continued to perform into his mid 70s. He also wrote a number of op-eds for The Plain Dealer.

Hagan's son Timothy Hagan was a county commissioner in Cuyahoga County, Ohio for 16 years, and was the Democratic nominee for Governor of Ohio in 2002 and was once-again elected Cuyahoga County Commissioner in 2004.

His other son, Robert F. Hagan, served in the Ohio House of Representatives and the Ohio Senate.

== See also ==
- List of Ohio lieutenant gubernatorial elections
