= Benny Bonanno =

American politician

Member of the Ohio House of Representatives from the 8th district
- In office January 3, 1979-November 18, 1982
- Preceded by: Ed Feighan
- Succeeded by: Barbara C. Pringle

Personal details
- Born: c. 1951
- Party: Democratic

Benny Bonanno is a former member of the Cleveland, Ohio City Council, Ohio House of Representatives, and Cuyahoga County Clerk of Courts.

He unsuccessfully ran for Mayor of Cleveland in 1989.
