= 1989 Cleveland mayoral election =

- November 7, 1989
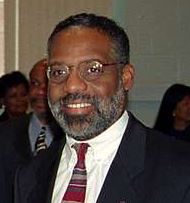

Candidate	Michael R. White	George L. Forbes
Party	Nonpartisan	Nonpartisan
Popular vote	85,829	68,167
Percentage	55.74%	44.27%
Mayor before election
George Voinovich
Republican
Elected mayor
Michael R. White
Democratic

The 1989 Cleveland mayoral election took place on November 7, 1989, to elect the Mayor of Cleveland, Ohio. The election was officially nonpartisan, with the top two candidates from the October 3 primary advancing to the general election.

Both candidates who advanced to the runoff were African American and Democrats.

== Candidates ==
- Benny Bonanno, County Recorder
- George L. Forbes, City Council President
- Tim Hagan, County Commissioner
- Ralph J. Perk Jr.
- Michael R. White, State Senator

== Primary election ==
Primary election results
Candidate	Votes	%
George L. Forbes	46,493	37.53%
Michael R. White	31,440	25.38%
Benny Bonanno	28,268	22.82%
Tim Hagan	11,799	9.52%
Ralph J. Perk, Jr.	5,891	4.76%
Total votes	123,891	

== General election ==
Cleveland mayoral election, 1989
Candidate	Votes	%
Michael R. White	85,829	55.74%
George L. Forbes	68,167	44.27%
Total votes	153,996	
