= Ed Feighan =

American politician (born 1947)

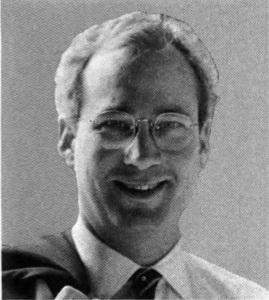

Member of the U.S. House of Representatives from Ohio's 19th district
- In office January 3, 1983 – January 3, 1993
- Preceded by: Lyle Williams
- Succeeded by: Eric Fingerhut

Member of the Ohio House of Representatives from the 8th district
- In office January 3, 1973 – December 31, 1978
- Preceded by: Jim Flannery
- Succeeded by: Benny Bonanno

Personal details
- Born: Edward Farrell Feighan; October 22, 1947 (age 78) Lakewood, Ohio, U.S.
- Party: Democratic
- Spouse: Nadine Feighan
- Relatives: Michael A. Feighan (uncle)
- Education: Loyola University New Orleans (BA); Cleveland State University (JD)

Edward Farrell Feighan (born October 22, 1947) is a former American politician. He served as a member of the Ohio House of Representatives, and as a Democratic Party U.S. Representative from 1983 to 1993, serving Ohio's 19th congressional district.

== Early life and education ==
Feighan was born in Lakewood, Ohio. He graduated in 1965 from St. Edward High School, an all-boys Catholic high school on Cleveland's west side. In 1969, he earned a Bachelor of Arts from Loyola University in New Orleans, LA. He attended Cleveland State University College of Law at Cleveland State University while serving in the legislature and received his Juris Doctor in 1978.

== Political career ==
Feighan was first elected to public office as a State Representative from Cleveland, Ohio, in 1972. He served for six years in the Ohio Legislature until his election as a Cuyahoga County Commissioner, a position he held from 1979 to 1983.

In 1977, Feighan ran for Mayor of Cleveland, but lost a narrow race to Dennis Kucinich, who also later became a member of Congress.

He was not a candidate for renomination in 1992 to the 103rd Congress, presumably due to his involvement in the House banking scandal and the specter of a primary fight against fellow incumbent Mary Rose Oakar due to redistricting.

== After politics ==
Feighan served as a director of ProCentury Corporation, a Westerville-based specialty insurance company, and its insurance subsidiaries from 1993 to 1996.

From November 1997 until August 1998, he was a Senior Vice President of Century Business Services, a Cleveland-based provider of outsourced business services now known as CBIZ.

From 1998 until 2000, Feighan was the president of Avalon National Corporation, a holding company for a workers’ compensation insurance agency. During that span, he was also a Managing Partner of Alliance Financial, Ltd., a merchant banking firm specializing in mergers and acquisitions from September 1998 until May 2003.

In 2000, he once again became director of ProCentury, for which he had been the on-and-off Special Counsel. In October 2003, Feighan became the chairman, president and CEO of ProCentury. However, he resigned on July 31, 2008, when it was sold to Meadowbrook Insurance Group.

Since February 2014, Feighan has served as the CEO of Covius, a commercial and residential real estate advisory services company.

== Electoral history ==
Ohio's 19th congressional district: Results 1982–1990
Year	Democrat	Votes	Pct	Republican	Votes	Pct	3rd Party	Party	Votes	Pct	3rd Party	Party	Votes	Pct
1982	Edward F. Feighan	111,760	58.84%	Richard G. Anter II	72,682	38.27%	Thomas Pekarek	Libertarian	3,129	1.65%	Kevin G. Killeen	Independent	2,371	1.25%
1984	Edward F. Feighan	139,605	55.21%	Matthew J. Hatchadorian	107,957	42.70%	(other)		5,277	2.09%				
1986	Edward F. Feighan	97,814	54.78%	Gary C. Suhadolnik	80,743	45.22%								
1988	Edward F. Feighan	168,065	70.49%	Noel F. Roberts	70,359	29.51%								
1990	Edward F. Feighan	132,951	64.77%	Susan M. Lawko	72,315	35.23%								

== See also ==
- List of United States representatives from Ohio

U.S. House of Representatives
Preceded by Lyle Williams	Member of the U.S. House of Representatives from Ohio's 19th congressional district 1983–1993	Succeeded by Eric Fingerhut
U.S. order of precedence (ceremonial)
Preceded by Bill Jenkins as Former U.S. Representative	Order of precedence of the United States as Former U.S. Representative	Succeeded by Bob Ney as Former U.S. Representative
