= George L. Forbes =

American politician (born 1931)

President of Cleveland City Council
- In office 1974–1989
- Preceded by: Anthony Garofoli
- Succeeded by: Jay Westbrook

Personal details
- Born: April 4, 1931 (age 95) Memphis, Tennessee, U.S.
- Party: Democratic
- Education: Baldwin-Wallace College (BA); Cleveland State University (JD)
- Occupation: politician, attorney
- Known for: City Council President, Cleveland NAACP President

George Lawrence Forbes (born April 4, 1931) is an American politician of the Democratic Party. From 1974 to 1989, Forbes served as president of the Cleveland City Council. He is the former President of the Cleveland NAACP and is semi-retired from practicing law.

== Early and personal life ==
Forbes was born in Memphis, Tennessee, in 1931. He was the son of a sharecropper. He served a tour in the U.S. Marine Corps and attended Baldwin-Wallace College on the G.I. Bill and graduated with a Bachelor of Arts in 1957. He received a Juris Doctor from Cleveland State University College of Law in 1961. He passed the Ohio bar exam and began practicing law.

He is married to Mary Forbes, and has three daughters, Lauren, Mildred "Mimi" and Helen Forbes Fields. He has three grandchildren, William, Camille, and Brandon

== Cleveland City Council ==
In 1963, he became a Cleveland councilman for Ward 27. At the time, Forbes was one of ten African Americans in the thirty seats in council. He was also instrumental in the effort to elect Carl Stokes as the first African American mayor of a major U.S. city. In 1967, Forbes was the chairman of "Operation Registration," a voter registration program targeting African American neighborhoods.

During his City Council tenure, but outside his official city duties, in 1971, Forbes assisted in the original formation of a law firm, formerly known as Rogers, Horton & Forbes, the largest minority-owned law firm in Ohio. It is now known as Forbes, Fields & Associates Co., L.P.A.

He later was elected council president in 1973 and assumed office in 1974. About a year later in 1975, Forbes and other (unspecified) investors bought out popular AM talk-radio station WERE and converted it into an all-news format that promptly flopped. It quickly changed back to an all-talk format.

Forbes was a polished politician and knew the ins and outs of the trade, eventually training future Cleveland mayor, Michael R. White. During the mayoral administration of Dennis Kucinich, Forbes sided with the unyielding banking interests against Kucinich before the city plunged into default. When George Voinovich became mayor in 1980, he made peace with council and Forbes. Due to Voinovich's low-key persona and Forbes's forthright attitude, critics of the Voinovich administration asserted that the mayor was giving Forbes too much power.

Forbes was outspoken, particularly on matters of race and the poor. His passion often led to heated exchanges with colleagues and the Cleveland media, more than a few of which turned physical. This included a confrontation with fellow councilman Jeff Johnson:

He [Forbes] picks up this chair, kept it in his hand and just swung," recalls Johnson. "I ducked, and the leg hit me on the shoulder. I was getting ready to go at this point, but his bodyguard stepped in. Guess you can swing chairs around when you've got a bodyguard.

According to author Edward P. Whelan: "Depending on the prism through which one views him, Forbes is either the city's savior or the most destructive, self-aggrandizing and divisive influence around. There is hardly anyone in the city who does not have strong feelings about him."

When Voinovich announced that he would not seek a fourth term as mayor in 1989, Forbes entered the heavily-contested mayoral race. He made it through the primary, but was defeated in the general election by his own protégé, Michael R. White. It was an ugly campaign, marred by back-and-forth slurs. White accused Forbes of using his wife, Mary, as a front person for improper investments, while Forbes painted White as a "wife beater" and a slum landlord. Afterwards, Forbes decided to leave politics for private practice.

Forbes told Cleveland journalist Dick Feagler on Friday, August 21, 2009, that he believed he lost the mayoral race due in part to the bombastic persona he projected as host of a local radio show where race was a frequent topic.

== After City Council ==
In 1992, Forbes returned to the public scene and won the presidency of the Cleveland NAACP.

In 1995, then-Gov. Voinovich appointed Forbes to the Ohio Bureau of Workers' Compensation oversight commission. He would later resign from the commission in 2005 after it was disclosed that his daughter worked for MDL Capital Management, which managed a Bermuda-based hedge fund operated for the BWC that lost $216 million. His daughter, Mildred "Mimi" Forbes, was a human resources manager for MDL.

== Community ==
Forbes was a long-time member of the Baldwin-Wallace College Board of Trustees.

Forbes is a recipient of the Louis Stokes Community Visionary Award. The city renamed a free overnight summer and winter camp for Cleveland's youth as Camp George L. Forbes. The camp is located in Highland Hills.

In late 2008, Forbes helped broker a deal with African American ministers to drop their effort to repeal Cleveland's Domestic Partner Registry ordinance.

On June 20, 2009, Forbes received the NAACP's highest award for meritorious service.

== Controversy ==
On July 18, 1979, Forbes was acquitted by a judge trial of seven counts of bribery and one count each of extortion, theft in office, and intimidation. The case was the first in a series of trials involving allegations that some city officials had accepted kickbacks from carnival operators.

In 1984, Forbes launched into a profanity-laced tirade when WJW I-TEAM Reporter Carl Monday asked him about his unpaid $400 water bill.

In 2002, Forbes was among the list of high-profile victims of convicted former Cleveland stockbroker Frank Gruttadauria.

On July 5, 2007, Forbes pleaded guilty to ethics charges related to an investigation involving the Ohio Bureau of Workers' Compensation's Coingate scandal. He was convicted of four counts of filing false financial disclosure statements and two counts of conflict of interest for accepting gifts from two investment brokers doing or seeking to do business with the BWC. He was ordered to pay $6,000 fine, repay a state agency another $6,000, and perform 60 hours of community service.

In October 2008, the Board of Commissioners on Grievances and Discipline of the Ohio Supreme Court recommended that Forbes receive a public reprimand. However, on June 11, 2009, the Ohio Supreme Court decided in a 5–2 ruling to sanction Forbes for his role in the Coingate scandal. The sanction was a six-month suspension of Forbes's license to practice law if he committed further misconduct.

== See also ==
- List of Baldwin-Wallace College people

Preceded by Anthony Garofoli	President of Cleveland City Council; 1974–1989	Succeeded by Jay Westbrook
