= Anthony Garofoli =

American politician and attorney

Anthony Garofoli (1936–2003) worked for the City of Cleveland, was an attorney, a politician of the Democratic Party in Cleveland, Ohio. Garofoli was born in Pittsburgh, Pennsylvania, but came to Cleveland to study at John Carroll University. He served on Cleveland City Council representing the Little Italy neighborhood of Cleveland.

| Preceded by James V. Stanton | President of Cleveland City Council; 1970–1973 | Succeeded by George L. Forbes |
