= CBIZ CPAs =

American CPA firm

- Formerly: Mayer Hoffman McCann P.C.
- Industry: Accounting
- Founded: 1954
- Headquarters: Kansas City, Missouri, United States
- Key people: Jeffrey Gluck, President and CEO
- Products: Professional services
- Website: www.cbizcpas.com

CBIZ CPAs (formerly known as Mayer Hoffman McCann P.C.) is a national CPA firm founded and headquartered in Kansas City, Missouri. MHM has over 30 offices in the United States.

== History ==
MHM dates back to 1954 with Ernst D. Mayer in Kansas City, Missouri. In 1960 the practice merged with Bill Hoffman's practice. MHM officially became Mayer Hoffman McCann in 1978 when Chuck McCann was added as a managing partner.

In August 2024, Mayer Hoffman McCann changed its name to CBIZ CPAs to "better align CBIZ CPAs' attest practice with CBIZ's non-attest practice".

=== Association with CBIZ Inc. ===
- In 1998 MHM spun off its tax and consulting practice, which was merged into Century Business Services, Inc, now known as CBIZ, Inc. That tax and consulting practice now operates as CBIZ MHM, LLC (a division of parent company CBIZ, Inc.). MHM maintains an association with CBIZ through an administrative services agreement and practices public accounting through an alternative practice structure as defined in American Institute of Certified Public Accountants (AICPA) Ethics Interpretation 101–14. However, MHM is owned and managed by its CPA shareholders.
- MHM (Mayer Hoffman McCann) and CBIZ are ranked by Accounting Today as one of the top national accounting providers in the country, ranking #10 in the 2016 ranking that was issued in spring of 2016.

=== Industries ===
MHM provides audit and attest services to industries including:

- Architecture, engineering and construction
- Manufacturing, retail and distribution
- Government
- Financial Institutions
- Software, high-tech and life sciences
- Not-for-profit

=== Other ===
CBIZ CPAs is licensed in all 50 states and a member of the AICPA's Center for Audit Quality, the Employee Benefit Plan Audit Quality Center, the Governmental Audit Quality Center and the Canadian Public Accountability Board.
