= Gateway Sports and Entertainment Complex =

Public building in downtown Cleveland, Ohio, USA

Coordinates: 41°29′47″N 81°41′13″W

Logo for the Gateway Sports Complex

The Gateway Sports and Entertainment Complex is an entertainment complex located in downtown area of Cleveland, Ohio. It opened in 1994 and is owned by the city of Cleveland and Cuyahoga County and is managed by the Gateway Economic Development Corporation, a non-profit group with board members who are appointed by county and city leaders.

The complex mainly consists of Progressive Field, a 34,830-seat baseball park that serves as home of the Cleveland Guardians of Major League Baseball, and Rocket Arena, a 19,432-seat arena primarily the home of the Cleveland Cavaliers of the National Basketball Association. In addition, the complex includes a transitional space known as Gateway Plaza and the Gateway East parking garage.

Gateway is roughly bounded by East 9th Street to the east, Huron Road to the north, Ontario Street to the west, and Carnegie Avenue to the south, and forms the basis of the larger Gateway District of downtown Cleveland.

The two facilities are connected to Tower City Center and the RTA Rapid Transit system via an underground walkway.

== Facilities ==
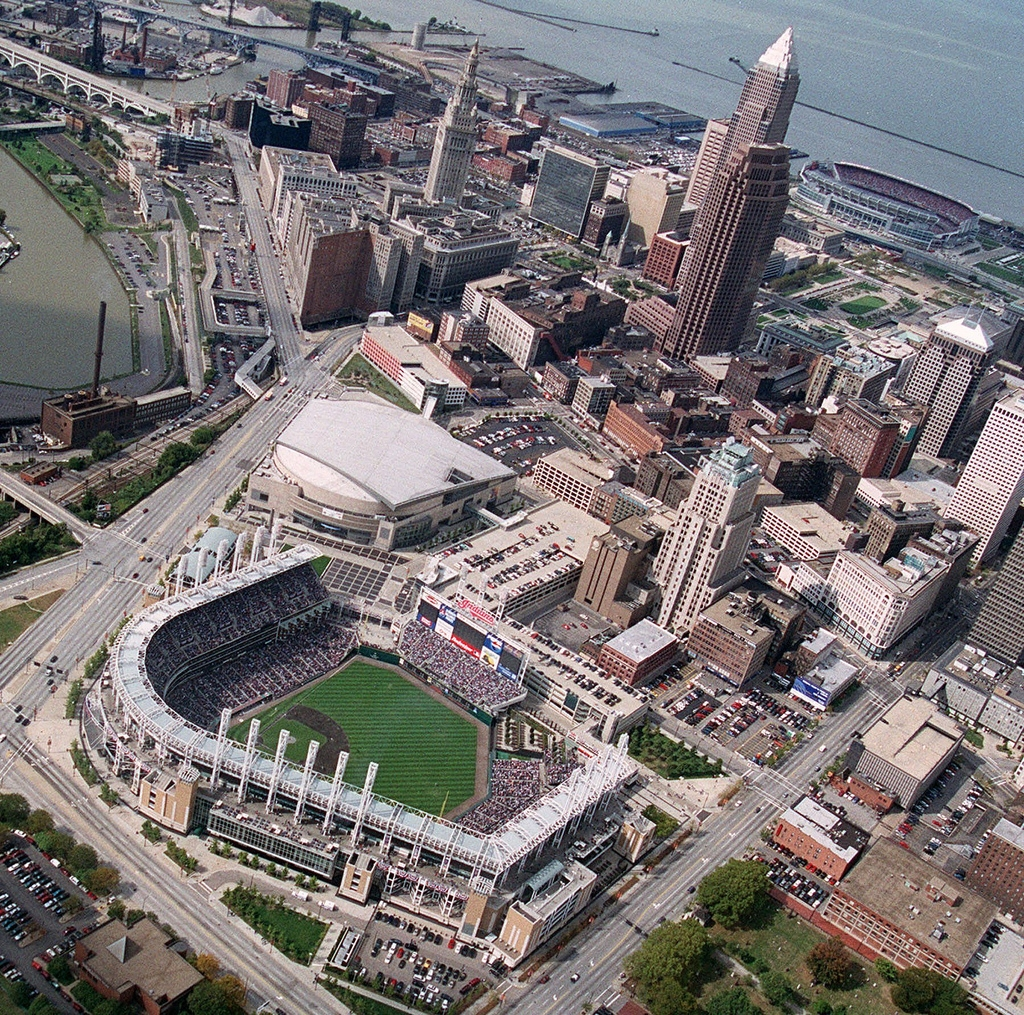
1999 aerial view of the complex and downtown area of Cleveland, Ohio

Progressive Field was completed first, opening on April 4, 1994, as Jacobs Field. It cost approximately $175 million to build, of which $91 million, or 52%, came from Indians owner Richard E. Jacobs. The remaining $84 million, or 48%, was from a 15-year sin tax. It was designed by HOK Sport (now known as Populous), a division of Hellmuth, Obata and Kassabaum. HOK designed it as a retro-modern ballpark, similar to their just-completed Oriole Park at Camden Yards in Baltimore, with asymmetrical fences of varying heights, a smaller upper deck, and stepped tiers. The ballpark was situated in a way that would showcase Cleveland's downtown skyline.

Rocket Arena, originally named Gund Arena and later known as Quicken Loans Arena and Rocket Mortgage FieldHouse, has dimensions of 480 feet (150 m) long by 440 feet (130 m) wide by 140 feet (43 m) high (750,000 square feet (70,000 m^{2})). It was designed by Ellerbe Becket Sports & Venue and Robert P. Madison International Inc., a local architectural firm. Similar to the ballpark's downtown views, the arena has a 108-foot (33 m) by 48-foot (15 m) bay window that faces southeast and shows off the city's industrial Flats. The construction and engineering were completed by an integrated team from Ellerbe Becket. The underground service area can accommodate 26 tour buses. It was built for approximately $152 million and opened on October 17, 1994.

Gateway Plaza is multifunctional open space situated between Rocket Arena to the north, Ontario Street to the west, Gateway East parking garage to the west, and Progressive Field to the south. However, it is technically bordered by Bolivar Road, Ontario Street, East 6th Street, and Larry Doby Way. It is primarily concrete roadway, but it does features decorative industrial art pieces and limited green space. On game days, it frequently hosts on-location radio and television broadcasts, along with satellite trucks for TV broadcast uplinks, as well as other game-related events. Some events for the 1997 MLB All-Star Game Fan Fest were held in Gateway Plaza.

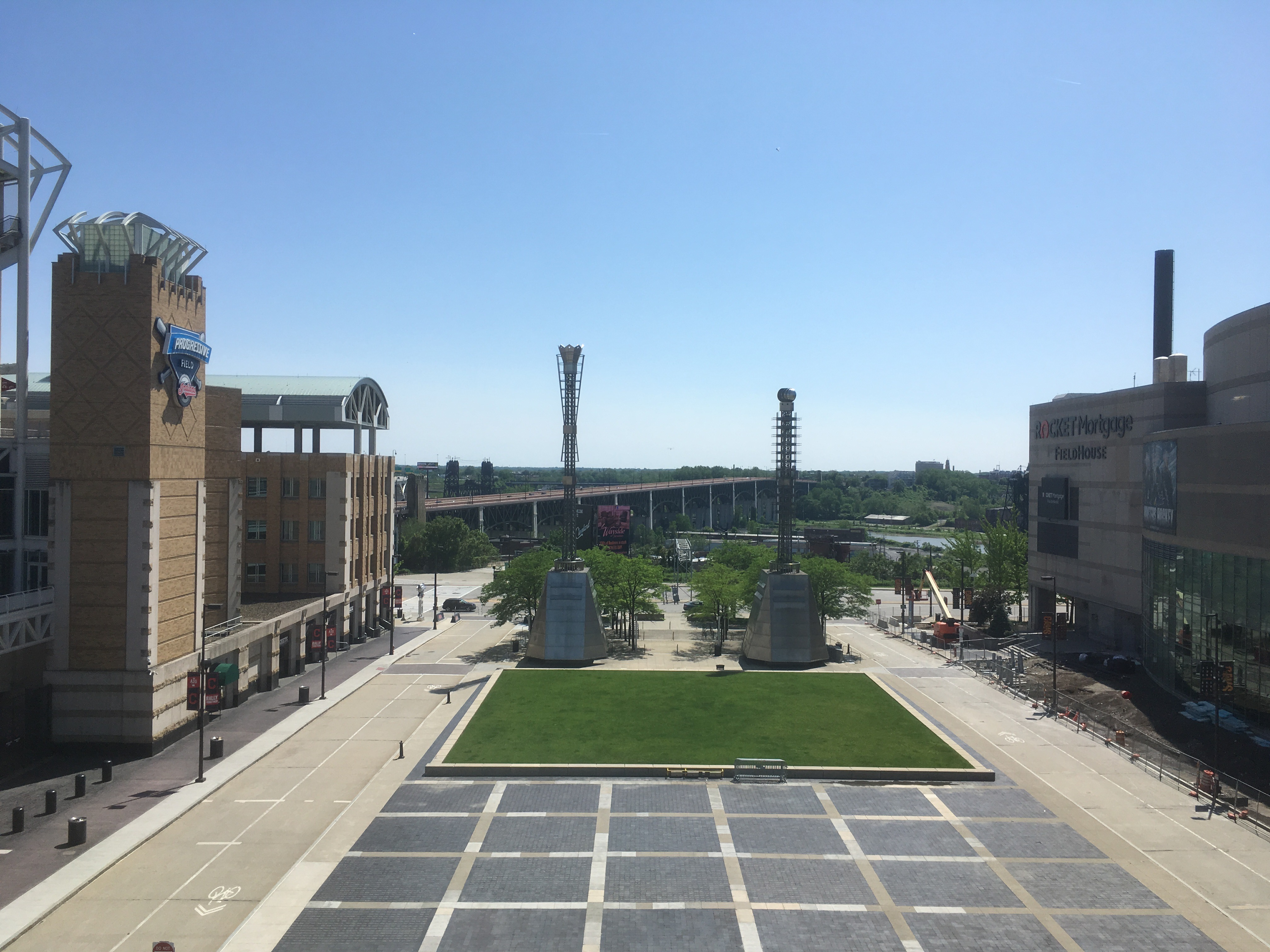
Gateway Plaza in 2019, view from the parking garage

The complex was built with two parking garages, which can hold a combined 3,300 cars. On the north end of the complex is the Jack Parking Garage, previously the Gateway North garage. It is a rectangular-shaped structure, with its main entrance on Ontario Street and another two on High Street. Originally, a third floor enclosed walkway above Huron Road connected its southeast corner to Rocket Arena, but this was removed in 2018 as part of a major renovation project on the arena. A second enclosed walkway was built in 2013 on the northwest corner of the garage that connects to Jack Cleveland Casino. The city of Cleveland built a downtown bike station in this garage in 2011. That same year, the facility was sold to Rock Caesar's Ohio and renovated to include a valet service and to serve as the main parking area for the casino. The garage is still available for events at Gateway, though is managed by the casino.

In between Rocket Arena and Progressive Field is the Gateway East garage, an L-shaped structure with two elevated walkways. A third floor enclosed walkway above East 6th Street connects on its western side to the arena, while an open walkway on the south side of the garage connects to the ballpark above Larry Doby Way. Originally there was an additional walkway over Larry Doby Way to the ballpark, but it was removed in 2014 during renovations to Progressive Field. The Gateway East Garage main entrance is on Huron Road, with a season-ticket holders entrance at East 6th and Bolivar and another at East 7th and Bolivar. It is managed by Standard Parking.

== History ==
=== Greater Cleveland Dome Stadium Corporation ===
The Gateway complex had its genesis in the early 1980s. The city of Cleveland had longed to bring the Cavaliers back to Cleveland since the team left for the Richfield Coliseum in 1974. Moreover, the Browns and Indians were housed in Cleveland Stadium, which was costing the city money in a time when it could ill-afford it. A major-league caliber sporting facility hadn't been built in Cleveland itself since the now-demolished Cleveland Arena opened in 1937.

A multipurpose dome would be the new home to the Browns and Indians, and would attract the Cavaliers back to Cleveland, according to the original proposal by County Commissioner Vincent Campanella. The concept was modeled after the Pontiac Silverdome, then home to the Detroit Lions. Browns owner Art Modell backed the domed stadium idea, as did Ohio Governor Dick Celeste, however, he did not like funding the project with property taxes. On May 8, 1984, a ballot initiative for the $150 million dome stadium went down in defeat by a 2-1 margin. In 1985, another dome called Hexatron, a six-sided structure with a retractable roof designed by local architect Robert Corna, was proposed but never left the drafting table. The proposed funding for Hexatron would be a sin tax on alcohol and cigarettes in Cuyahoga County, an idea floated by a young member of the Ohio House of Representatives named Jeffery P. Jacobs, the son of the future Indians owner Richard E. Jacobs.

Still, Cleveland Mayor George Voinovich and Governor Celeste pushed forward to create the Greater Cleveland Dome Stadium Corporation, borrowing $22 million from banks and the state of Ohio. Cleveland Tomorrow, a group of top executives from Cleveland's biggest firms, launched a development fund to further the project, and acquisition of property began in December 1985. By 1989, the site of the former Central Market, a fruit and vegetable market that dated back to 1856, and other adjacent buildings were razed and made into parking lots. However, there were funding gaps and big disagreements as to who would pay to build the project, along with a change in leadership.

=== Ballot Issue 2 ===
In 1990, new leadership took the baton from the dome stadium group. The team was a partnership of Cleveland Tomorrow, led by lawyer Tom Chema, and a group of elected officials. The group included newly elected Mayor Michael R. White, newly elevated Cleveland City Council President Jay Westbrook, along with Cuyahoga County Commissioners Tim Hagan, Virgil Brown, Mary Boyle, and Jim Petro. The group hastily coordinated a plan to finance the complex by asking county voters for a 15-year sin tax, styled after the Hexatron plan. The tax, which amounted to 1.9 cents on a can of beer, 1.5 cents per ounce of liquor, and 4.5 cents on a pack of cigarettes, would be a way get suburban county voters to pay for the project. But it required a countywide vote, which added it to the May primary election ballot as "Issue 2" in the hopes that it would pass with the normally light turnout.

There was heavy advertising both for and against Issue 2. There was also a Major League Baseball lockout in February 1990 over player salaries. It directly threatened weaker teams, such as the Indians, that did not have the cushion of additional revenues from luxury boxes and other stadium amenities. Just days before the vote, baseball commissioner Fay Vincent attended a city council finance committee meeting and stated, "should the vote [on Issue 2] be a negative one, we may find ourselves confronting a subject we want to avoid."

These factors helped drive a large turnout, as 49.6% of registered voters cast ballots. On May 8, 1990, Issue 2 passed by a slim 51% margin (198,390-185,209). A month later, Mayor White and Commissioner Hagan created Gateway Economic Development Corporation, a non-profit organization, and installed Chema as its executive director.

Both venues were completed in 1994. Todd Greathouse is the current executive director of the Gateway Economic Development Corporation.
