= Elmwood High School (Bloomdale, Ohio) =

Location
- 7650 Jerry City Road; Bloomdale, Wood, Ohio 44817; United States
- Coordinates: 41°15′17″N 83°33′04″W

Information
- School district: Elmwood Local School District
- Teaching staff: 23.77 (FTE)
- Grades: 9-12
- Enrollment: 321 (2023–2024)
- Student to teacher ratio: 13.50
- Colors: Royal Blue and White
- Athletics conference: Blanchard Valley Conference
- Mascot: Royal
- Website: www.elmwood.k12.oh.us/high-school.html

Elmwood High School is a public high school in Bloomdale. It is the only high school in the Elmwood Local School District, which primarily serves Bloom, Montgomery, Perry, and Portage townships in Wood County, but also serves parts of Center and Freedom townships. The towns of Bairdstown, Bloomdale, Cygnet, Jerry City, Wayne, and West Millgrove are also included in the district.

Their mascot is the Royals, generally being represented by a lion. They are currently members of the Blanchard Valley Conference after leaving the Northern Buckeye Conference in 2023.

Elmwood was created in 1957 when the school districts from Bloomdale, Cygnet, Montgomery, and Portage merged. Bradner was part of the Montgomery district, but refused to join the merger and ultimately wound up with Lakota Local School District in 1959.

== Notable alumni ==
- Chris Hoiles, Former MLB player (Baltimore Orioles)
- Jennifer Harris Trosper NASA Mars Rover Project Manager
- Gus Wasson, Former stock car racing driver
