= List of municipalities in Ohio =

Ohio municipalities
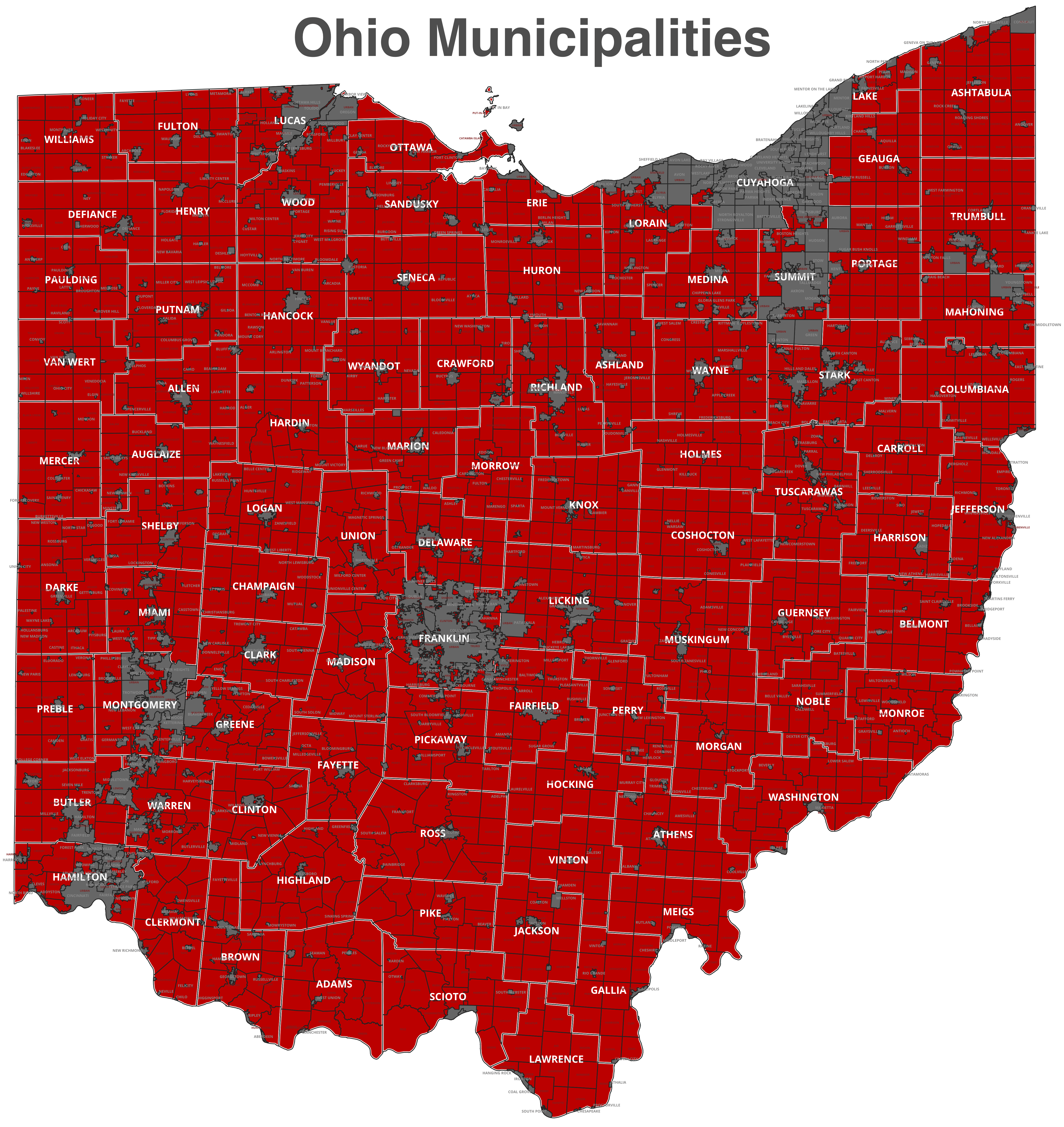
- Map of the 931 municipalities in Ohio
- Category: Second-level administrative division
- Location: Ohio
- Number: 931 (Note: There are 247 cities and 684 villages in the state.)
- Populations: 28 (Rendville) – 905,748 (Columbus)
- Areas: 0.3 square miles (0.78 km^{2}) (Rendville) – 226.3 square miles (586 km^{2}) (Columbus)
- Government: Municipal government

Ohio is a state located in the Midwestern United States. Cities in Ohio are municipalities whose population is no less than 5,000; smaller municipalities are called villages. Nonresident college students and incarcerated inmates do not count towards the city requirement of 5,000 residents. There are currently 253 cities and 673 villages in Ohio, for a total of 926 municipalities. The most populous city in Ohio is Columbus with 905,748 residents.

Municipality names are not unique: there is a village of Centerville in Gallia County and a city of Centerville in Montgomery County; there is also a city of Oakwood in Montgomery County as well as the villages of Oakwood in Cuyahoga County and Oakwood in Paulding County. Bay Village and The Village of Indian Hill are cities despite the word "Village" in their names, and 16 villages have "City" in their names.

Map of the United States with Ohio highlighted

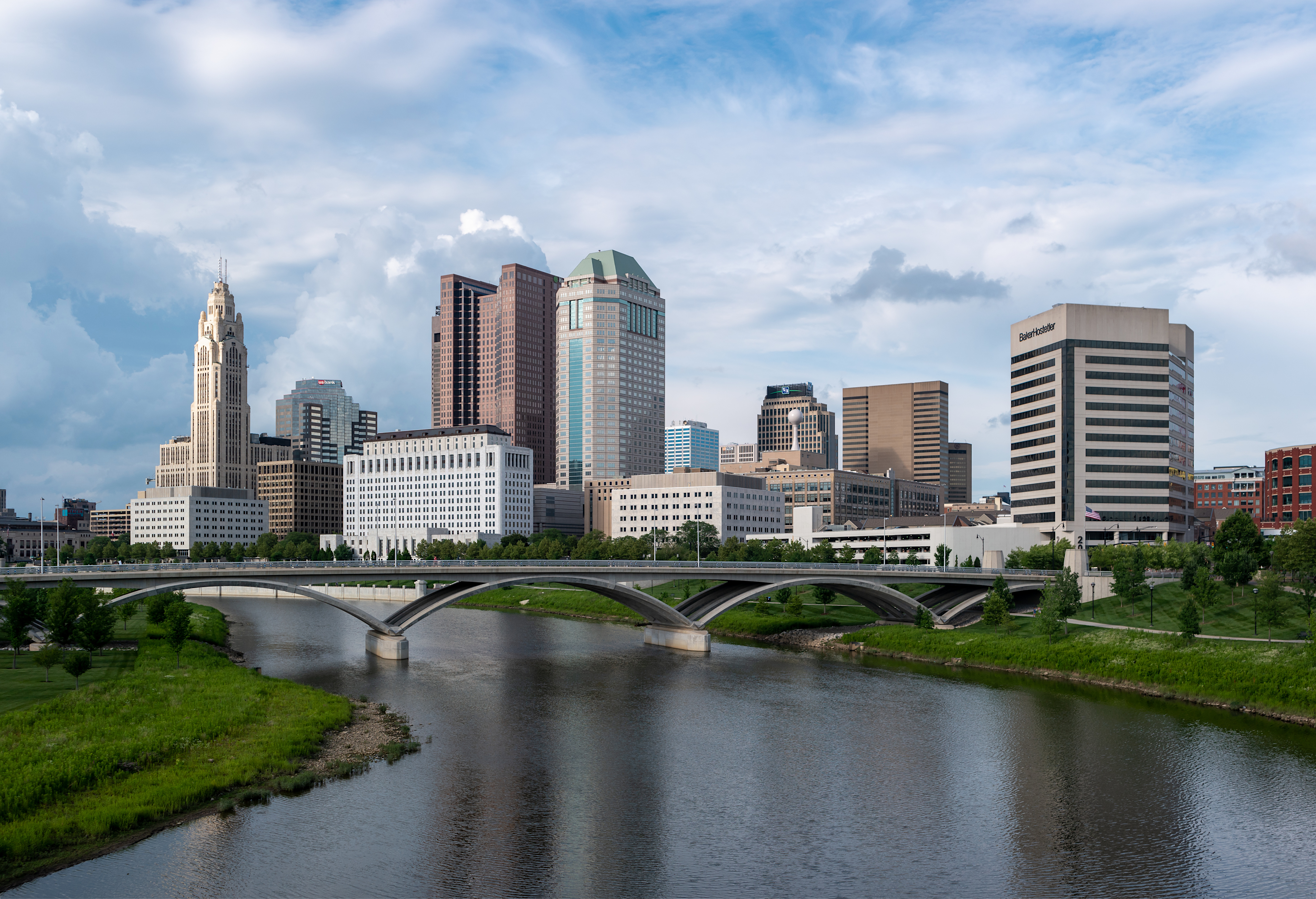
Columbus is the capital and most populous city in Ohio.

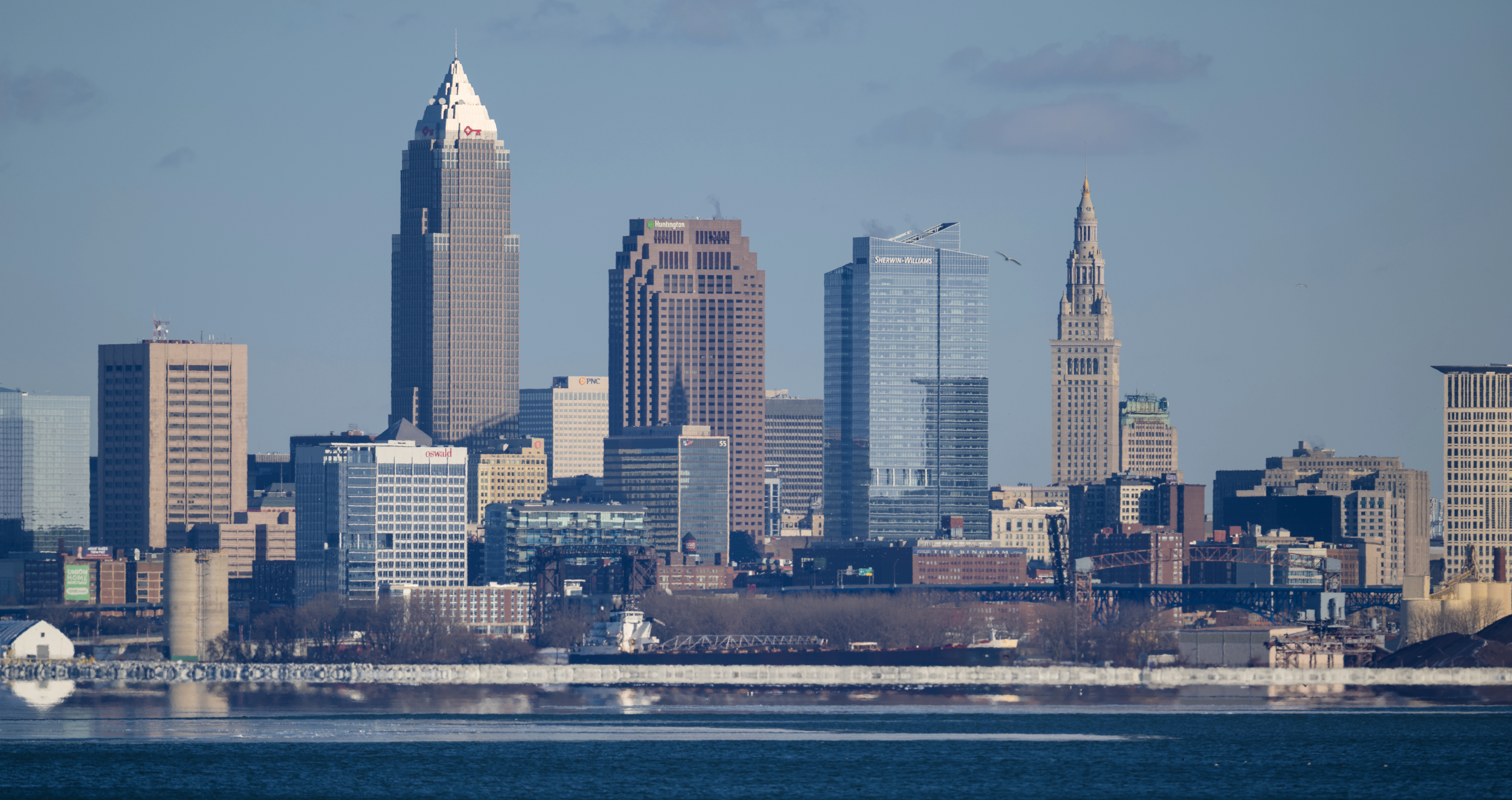
Cleveland is the state's second-most populous city.

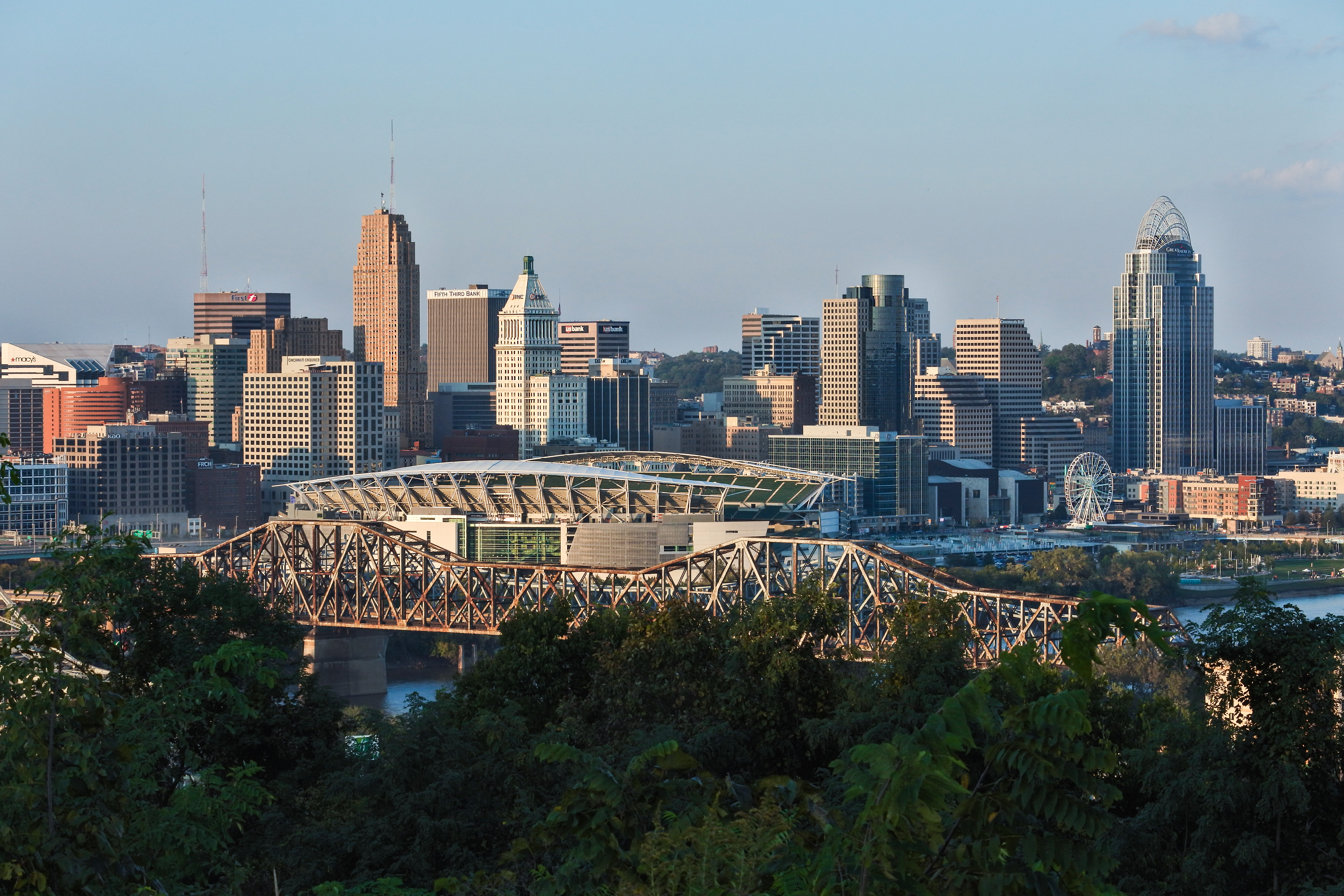
Cincinnati is the state's third-most populous city.

County seat† State capital and county seat‡

Municipalities
Name	Class	Population (2020)	Population (2010)	Change	County
Aberdeen	Village	1,515	1,638	−7.51%	Brown
Ada	Village	5,334	5,952	−10.38%	Hardin
Adamsville	Village	140	114	+22.81%	Muskingum
Addyston	Village	927	938	−1.17%	Hamilton
Adelphi	Village	322	380	−15.26%	Ross
Adena	Village	664	759	−12.52%	Jefferson, Harrison
Akron †	City	190,469	198,090	−3.85%	Summit
Albany	Village	917	828	+10.75%	Athens
Alexandria	Village	483	517	−6.58%	Licking
Alger	Village	837	860	−2.67%	Hardin
Alliance	City	21,672	21,616	+0.26%	Stark, Mahoning
Amanda	Village	673	737	−8.68%	Fairfield
Amberley	Village	3,840	3,585	+7.11%	Hamilton
Amesville	Village	171	154	+11.04%	Athens
Amherst	City	12,681	12,021	+5.49%	Lorain
Amsterdam	Village	436	511	−14.68%	Jefferson
Andover	Village	972	1,145	−15.11%	Ashtabula
Anna	Village	1,470	1,567	−6.19%	Shelby
Ansonia	Village	1,160	1,174	−1.19%	Darke
Antioch	Village	71	86	−17.44%	Monroe
Antwerp	Village	1,676	1,736	−3.46%	Paulding
Apple Creek	Village	1,188	1,173	+1.28%	Wayne
Arcadia	Village	564	590	−4.41%	Hancock
Arcanum	Village	2,347	2,129	+10.24%	Darke
Archbold	Village	4,516	4,346	+3.91%	Fulton
Arlington	Village	1,492	1,455	+2.54%	Hancock
Arlington Heights	Village	823	745	+10.47%	Hamilton
Ashland †	City	19,225	20,423	−5.87%	Ashland
Ashley	Village	1,198	1,330	−9.92%	Delaware
Ashtabula	City	17,975	18,079	−0.58%	Ashtabula
Ashville	Village	4,529	4,097	+10.54%	Pickaway
Athalia	Village	279	373	−25.20%	Lawrence
Athens †	City	23,849	24,688	−3.40%	Athens
Attica	Village	873	899	−2.89%	Seneca
Aurora	City	17,239	16,230	+6.22%	Portage
Avon	City	24,847	23,263	+6.81%	Lorain
Avon Lake	City	25,206	24,391	+3.34%	Lorain
Bailey Lakes	Village	349	371	−5.93%	Ashland
Bainbridge	Village	765	860	−11.05%	Ross
Bairdstown	Village	115	130	−11.54%	Wood
Baltic	Village	851	795	+7.04%	Tuscarawas, Holmes, Coshocton
Baltimore	Village	2,981	2,966	+0.51%	Fairfield
Barberton	City	25,191	26,072	−3.38%	Summit
Barnesville	Village	4,008	4,193	−4.41%	Belmont
Barnhill	Village	383	396	−3.28%	Tuscarawas
Batavia †	Village	1,972	1,509	+30.68%	Clermont
Batesville	Village	101	71	+42.25%	Noble
Bay View	Village	608	632	−3.80%	Erie
Bay Village	City	16,163	15,295	+5.68%	Cuyahoga
Beach City	Village	940	1,033	−9.00%	Stark
Beachwood	City	14,040	11,953	+17.46%	Cuyahoga
Beallsville	Village	355	409	−13.20%	Monroe
Beaver	Village	442	449	−1.56%	Pike
Beavercreek	City	46,549	47,391	−1.78%	Greene
Beaverdam	Village	319	382	−16.49%	Allen
Bedford	City	13,149	13,074	+0.57%	Cuyahoga
Bedford Heights	City	11,020	10,751	+2.50%	Cuyahoga
Bellaire	Village	3,870	4,278	−9.54%	Belmont
Bellbrook	City	7,317	6,943	+5.39%	Greene
Belle Center	Village	809	813	−0.49%	Logan
Belle Valley	Village	201	223	−9.87%	Noble
Bellefontaine †	City	14,115	13,370	+5.57%	Logan
Bellevue	City	8,249	8,202	+0.57%	Sandusky, Huron, Erie
Bellville	Village	1,963	1,918	+2.35%	Richland
Belmont	Village	414	453	−8.61%	Belmont
Belmore	Village	65	143	−54.55%	Putnam
Beloit	Village	903	978	−7.67%	Mahoning
Belpre	City	6,728	6,441	+4.46%	Washington
Bentleyville	Village	897	864	+3.82%	Cuyahoga
Benton Ridge	Village	272	299	−9.03%	Hancock
Berea	City	18,545	18,655	−0.59%	Cuyahoga
Bergholz	Village	544	664	−18.07%	Jefferson
Berkey	Village	275	237	+16.03%	Lucas
Berlin Heights	Village	651	714	−8.82%	Erie
Bethel	Village	2,620	2,711	−3.36%	Clermont
Bethesda	Village	1,211	1,256	−3.58%	Belmont
Bettsville	Village	595	661	−9.98%	Seneca
Beverly	Village	1,233	1,313	−6.09%	Washington
Bexley	City	13,928	13,057	+6.67%	Franklin
Blakeslee	Village	104	96	+8.33%	Williams
Blanchester	Village	4,224	4,243	−0.45%	Clinton, Warren
Bloomdale	Village	665	678	−1.92%	Wood
Bloomingburg	Village	878	938	−6.40%	Fayette
Bloomingdale	Village	145	202	−28.22%	Jefferson
Bloomville	Village	867	956	−9.31%	Seneca
Blue Ash	City	13,394	12,114	+10.57%	Hamilton
Bluffton	Village	3,967	4,125	−3.83%	Allen, Hancock
Bolivar	Village	1,000	994	+0.60%	Tuscarawas
Boston Heights	Village	1,402	1,300	+7.85%	Summit
Botkins	Village	1,155	1,155	0.00%	Shelby
Bowerston	Village	356	398	−10.55%	Harrison
Bowersville	Village	261	312	−16.35%	Greene
Bowling Green †	City	30,808	30,028	+2.60%	Wood
Bradford	Village	1,796	1,842	−2.50%	Miami, Darke
Bradner	Village	971	985	−1.42%	Wood
Bratenahl	Village	1,430	1,197	+19.47%	Cuyahoga
Brecksville	City	13,635	13,656	−0.15%	Cuyahoga
Bremen	Village	1,479	1,425	+3.79%	Fairfield
Brewster	Village	2,113	2,112	+0.05%	Stark
Brice	Village	93	114	−18.42%	Franklin
Bridgeport	Village	1,582	1,831	−13.60%	Belmont
Broadview Heights	City	19,936	19,400	+2.76%	Cuyahoga
Brook Park	City	18,595	18,533	+0.33%	Cuyahoga
Brooklyn	City	11,359	11,169	+1.70%	Cuyahoga
Brooklyn Heights	Village	1,519	1,543	−1.56%	Cuyahoga
Brookside	Village	538	632	−14.87%	Belmont
Brookville	City	5,989	5,868	+2.06%	Montgomery
Broughton	Village	116	120	−3.33%	Paulding
Brunswick	City	35,426	34,897	+1.52%	Medina
Bryan †	City	8,729	8,545	+2.15%	Williams
Buchtel	Village	518	558	−7.17%	Athens, Hocking
Buckeye Lake	Village	2,520	2,746	−8.23%	Licking, Fairfield
Buckland	Village	233	233	0.00%	Auglaize
Bucyrus †	City	11,684	12,362	−5.48%	Crawford
Burbank	Village	296	207	+43.00%	Wayne
Burgoon	Village	183	172	+6.40%	Sandusky
Burkettsville	Village	272	244	+11.48%	Mercer, Darke
Burton	Village	1,407	1,452	−3.10%	Geauga
Butler	Village	941	933	+0.86%	Richland
Butlerville	Village	155	163	−4.91%	Warren
Byesville	Village	2,364	2,438	−3.04%	Guernsey
Cadiz †	Village	3,051	3,353	−9.01%	Harrison
Cairo	Village	517	524	−1.34%	Allen
Caldwell †	Village	1,691	1,748	−3.26%	Noble
Caledonia	Village	560	577	−2.95%	Marion
Cambridge †	City	10,089	10,635	−5.13%	Guernsey
Camden	Village	1,989	2,046	−2.79%	Preble
Campbell	City	7,852	8,235	−4.65%	Mahoning
Canal Fulton	City	5,325	5,479	−2.81%	Stark
Canal Winchester	City	9,107	7,101	+28.25%	Franklin, Fairfield
Canfield	City	7,699	7,126	+8.04%	Mahoning
Canton †	City	70,872	73,007	−2.92%	Stark
Cardington	Village	2,079	2,047	+1.56%	Morrow
Carey	Village	3,565	3,674	−2.97%	Wyandot
Carlisle	City	5,501	4,915	+11.92%	Warren, Montgomery
Carroll	Village	501	524	−4.39%	Fairfield
Carrollton †	Village	3,087	3,241	−4.75%	Carroll
Casstown	Village	270	267	+1.12%	Miami
Castalia	Village	774	852	−9.15%	Erie
Castine	Village	110	130	−15.38%	Darke
Catawba	Village	245	272	−9.93%	Clark
Cecil	Village	146	188	−22.34%	Paulding
Cedarville	Village	4,257	4,019	+5.92%	Greene
Celina †	City	10,935	10,400	+5.14%	Mercer
Centerburg	Village	1,690	1,733	−2.48%	Knox
Centerville	City	24,240	23,772	+1.97%	Montgomery, Greene
Centerville	Village	87	103	−15.53%	Gallia
Chagrin Falls	Village	4,188	4,104	+2.05%	Cuyahoga
Chardon †	City	5,242	5,148	+1.83%	Geauga
Chatfield	Village	205	189	+8.47%	Crawford
Chauncey	Village	959	1,049	−8.58%	Athens
Chesapeake	Village	765	745	+2.68%	Lawrence
Cheshire	Village	123	132	−6.82%	Gallia
Chesterhill	Village	276	289	−4.50%	Morgan
Chesterville	Village	191	228	−16.23%	Morrow
Cheviot	City	8,658	8,375	+3.38%	Hamilton
Chickasaw	Village	358	290	+23.45%	Mercer
Chillicothe †	City	22,059	21,901	+0.72%	Ross
Chilo	Village	71	63	+12.70%	Clermont
Chippewa Lake	Village	654	711	−8.02%	Medina
Christiansburg	Village	505	526	−3.99%	Champaign
Cincinnati †	City	309,317	302,605	+2.22%	Hamilton
Circleville †	City	13,927	13,314	+4.60%	Pickaway
Clarington	Village	280	384	−27.08%	Monroe
Clarksburg	Village	409	455	−10.11%	Ross
Clarksville	Village	534	548	−2.55%	Clinton
Clay Center	Village	262	276	−5.07%	Ottawa
Clayton	City	13,310	13,209	+0.76%	Montgomery
Cleveland †	City	372,624	383,793	−2.91%	Cuyahoga
Cleveland Heights	City	45,312	44,382	+2.10%	Cuyahoga
Cleves	Village	3,414	3,234	+5.57%	Hamilton
Clifton	Village	131	152	−13.82%	Greene, Clark
Clinton	Village	1,197	1,214	−1.40%	Summit
Cloverdale	Village	170	168	+1.19%	Putnam
Clyde	City	6,294	6,325	−0.49%	Sandusky
Coal Grove	Village	1,889	2,165	−12.75%	Lawrence
Coalton	Village	445	479	−7.10%	Jackson
Coldwater	Village	4,774	4,427	+7.84%	Mercer
College Corner	Village	387	407	−4.91%	Preble, Butler
Columbiana	City	6,559	6,384	+2.74%	Columbiana, Mahoning
Columbus ‡	City	905,748	787,033	+15.08%	Franklin (seat), Delaware, Fairfield
Columbus Grove	Village	2,160	2,137	+1.08%	Putnam
Commercial Point	Village	3,078	1,582	+94.56%	Pickaway
Conesville	Village	328	347	−5.48%	Coshocton
Congress	Village	132	185	−28.65%	Wayne
Conneaut	City	12,318	10,189	+20.90%	Ashtabula
Continental	Village	1,102	1,153	−4.42%	Putnam
Convoy	Village	1,012	1,085	−6.73%	Van Wert
Coolville	Village	454	496	−8.47%	Athens
Corning	Village	488	583	−16.30%	Perry
Cortland	City	7,105	7,104	+0.01%	Trumbull
Corwin	Village	484	421	+14.96%	Warren
Coshocton †	City	11,050	11,216	−1.48%	Coshocton
Covington	Village	2,548	2,584	−1.39%	Miami
Craig Beach	Village	1,076	1,180	−8.81%	Mahoning
Crestline	Village	4,525	4,630	−2.27%	Crawford, Richland
Creston	Village	2,139	2,171	−1.47%	Wayne, Medina
Cridersville	Village	1,791	1,852	−3.29%	Auglaize
Crooksville	Village	2,418	2,534	−4.58%	Perry
Crown City	Village	424	413	+2.66%	Gallia
Cumberland	Village	317	367	−13.62%	Guernsey
Custar	Village	178	179	−0.56%	Wood
Cuyahoga Falls	City	51,114	49,272	+3.74%	Summit
Cuyahoga Heights	Village	573	638	−10.19%	Cuyahoga
Cygnet	Village	543	597	−9.05%	Wood
Dalton	Village	1,927	1,830	+5.30%	Wayne
Danville	Village	1,019	1,044	−2.39%	Knox
Darbyville	Village	186	222	−16.22%	Pickaway
Dayton †	City	137,644	140,640	−2.13%	Montgomery (seat), Greene
De Graff	Village	1,250	1,285	−2.72%	Logan
Deer Park	City	5,432	5,736	−5.30%	Hamilton
Deersville	Village	69	79	−12.66%	Harrison
Defiance †	City	17,066	16,663	+2.42%	Defiance
Delaware †	City	41,302	39,930	+3.44%	Delaware
Dellroy	Village	268	356	−24.72%	Carroll
Delphos	City	7,117	7,101	+0.23%	Allen, Van Wert
Delta	Village	3,316	3,103	+6.86%	Fulton
Dennison	Village	2,709	2,655	+2.03%	Tuscarawas
Deshler	Village	1,588	1,799	−11.73%	Henry
Dexter City	Village	81	129	−37.21%	Noble
Dillonvale	Village	589	665	−11.43%	Jefferson
Donnelsville	Village	255	304	−16.12%	Clark
Dover	City	13,112	12,826	+2.23%	Tuscarawas
Doylestown	Village	3,051	3,051	0.00%	Wayne
Dresden	Village	1,650	1,529	+7.91%	Muskingum
Dublin	City	49,328	48,647	+1.40%	Franklin, Union, Delaware
Dunkirk	Village	774	875	−11.54%	Hardin
Dupont	Village	212	318	−33.33%	Putnam
East Canton	Village	1,521	1,591	−4.40%	Stark
East Cleveland	City	13,792	17,109	−19.39%	Cuyahoga
East Liverpool	City	9,958	11,195	−11.05%	Columbiana
East Palestine	Village	4,761	4,721	+0.85%	Columbiana
East Sparta	Village	749	819	−8.55%	Stark
Eastlake	City	17,670	18,131	−2.54%	Lake
Eaton †	City	8,375	8,407	−0.38%	Preble
Edgerton	Village	1,881	2,012	−6.51%	Williams
Edison	Village	422	437	−3.43%	Morrow
Edon	Village	796	834	−4.56%	Williams
Eldorado	Village	458	509	−10.02%	Preble
Elgin	Village	49	57	−14.04%	Van Wert
Elida	Village	1,923	1,905	+0.94%	Allen
Elmore	Village	1,370	1,410	−2.84%	Ottawa, Sandusky
Elmwood Place	Village	2,087	2,188	−4.62%	Hamilton
Elyria †	City	52,656	53,131	−0.89%	Lorain
Empire	Village	232	299	−22.41%	Jefferson
Englewood	City	13,463	13,465	−0.01%	Montgomery
Enon	Village	2,449	2,415	+1.41%	Clark
Euclid	City	49,692	46,936	+5.87%	Cuyahoga
Evendale	Village	2,669	2,767	−3.54%	Hamilton
Fairborn	City	34,510	33,658	+2.53%	Greene
Fairfax	Village	1,768	1,699	+4.06%	Hamilton
Fairfield	City	44,907	42,229	+6.34%	Butler, Hamilton
Fairlawn	City	7,710	7,437	+3.67%	Summit
Fairport Harbor	Village	3,108	3,109	−0.03%	Lake
Fairview	Village	67	83	−19.28%	Guernsey, Belmont
Fairview Park	City	17,291	16,826	+2.76%	Cuyahoga
Farmersville	Village	975	1,009	−3.37%	Montgomery
Fayette	Village	1,305	1,283	+1.71%	Fulton
Fayetteville	Village	317	330	−3.94%	Brown
Felicity	Village	651	818	−20.42%	Clermont
Findlay †	City	40,313	41,327	−2.45%	Hancock
Fletcher	Village	451	473	−4.65%	Miami
Florida	Village	215	232	−7.33%	Henry
Flushing	Village	830	879	−5.57%	Belmont
Forest	Village	1,350	1,461	−7.60%	Hardin
Forest Park	City	20,189	18,658	+8.21%	Hamilton
Fort Jennings	Village	525	485	+8.25%	Putnam
Fort Loramie	Village	1,590	1,478	+7.58%	Shelby
Fort Recovery	Village	1,501	1,430	+4.97%	Mercer
Fostoria	City	13,046	13,441	−2.94%	Seneca, Hancock, Wood
Frankfort	Village	1,084	1,064	+1.88%	Ross
Franklin	City	11,690	11,771	−0.69%	Warren
Frazeysburg	Village	1,354	1,326	+2.11%	Muskingum
Fredericksburg	Village	409	423	−3.31%	Wayne
Fredericktown	Village	2,648	2,493	+6.22%	Knox
Freeport	Village	321	369	−13.01%	Harrison
Fremont †	City	15,930	16,734	−4.80%	Sandusky
Fulton	Village	250	258	−3.10%	Morrow
Fultonham	Village	115	176	−34.66%	Muskingum
Gahanna	City	35,726	33,248	+7.45%	Franklin
Galena	Village	924	653	+41.50%	Delaware
Galion	City	10,453	10,512	−0.56%	Crawford, Richland, Morrow
Gallipolis †	Village	3,313	3,641	−9.01%	Gallia
Gambier	Village	2,213	2,391	−7.44%	Knox
Gann	Village	114	125	−8.80%	Knox
Garfield Heights	City	29,781	28,849	+3.23%	Cuyahoga
Garrettsville	Village	2,449	2,325	+5.33%	Portage
Gates Mills	Village	2,264	2,270	−0.26%	Cuyahoga
Geneva	City	5,924	6,215	−4.68%	Ashtabula
Geneva-on-the-Lake	Village	916	1,288	−28.88%	Ashtabula
Genoa	Village	2,232	2,336	−4.45%	Ottawa
Georgetown †	Village	4,453	4,331	+2.82%	Brown
Germantown	City	5,796	6,215	−6.74%	Montgomery
Gettysburg	Village	463	513	−9.75%	Darke
Gibsonburg	Village	2,452	2,581	−5.00%	Sandusky
Gilboa	Village	168	184	−8.70%	Putnam
Girard	City	9,603	7,909	+21.42%	Trumbull
Glandorf	Village	969	1,001	−3.20%	Putnam
Glendale	Village	2,298	2,155	+6.64%	Hamilton
Glenford	Village	165	173	−4.62%	Perry
Glenmont	Village	240	272	−11.76%	Holmes
Glenwillow	Village	994	923	+7.69%	Cuyahoga
Gloria Glens Park	Village	369	425	−13.18%	Medina
Glouster	Village	1,659	1,791	−7.37%	Athens
Gnadenhutten	Village	1,240	1,288	−3.73%	Tuscarawas
Golf Manor	Village	3,814	3,611	+5.62%	Hamilton
Gordon	Village	245	212	+15.57%	Darke
Grafton	Village	5,895	6,636	−11.17%	Lorain
Grand Rapids	Village	925	965	−4.15%	Wood
Grand River	Village	394	399	−1.25%	Lake
Grandview Heights	City	8,085	6,536	+23.70%	Franklin
Granville	Village	5,946	5,646	+5.31%	Licking
Gratiot	Village	215	221	−2.71%	Licking, Muskingum
Gratis	Village	842	881	−4.43%	Preble
Graysville	Village	70	76	−7.89%	Monroe
Green	City	27,475	25,699	+6.91%	Summit
Green Camp	Village	310	374	−17.11%	Marion
Green Springs	Village	1,233	1,368	−9.87%	Seneca, Sandusky
Greenfield	Village	4,339	4,639	−6.47%	Highland, Ross
Greenhills	Village	3,741	3,615	+3.49%	Hamilton
Greenville †	City	12,786	13,227	−3.33%	Darke
Greenwich	Village	1,409	1,476	−4.54%	Huron
Grove City	City	41,252	41,627	−0.90%	Franklin
Groveport	City	6,009	5,363	+12.05%	Franklin
Grover Hill	Village	382	402	−4.98%	Paulding
Hamden	Village	727	879	−17.29%	Vinton
Hamersville	Village	485	546	−11.17%	Brown
Hamilton †	City	63,399	62,174	+1.97%	Butler
Hamler	Village	600	576	+4.17%	Henry
Hanging Rock	Village	204	221	−7.69%	Lawrence
Hanover	Village	1,270	921	+37.89%	Licking
Hanoverton	Village	354	408	−13.24%	Columbiana
Harbor View	Village	89	123	−27.64%	Lucas
Harpster	Village	160	204	−21.57%	Wyandot
Harrisburg	Village	315	320	−1.56%	Franklin, Pickaway
Harrison	City	12,563	9,897	+26.94%	Hamilton
Harrisville	Village	179	235	−23.83%	Harrison
Harrod	Village	423	417	+1.44%	Allen
Hartford	Village	404	397	+1.76%	Licking
Hartville	Village	3,329	2,944	+13.08%	Stark
Harveysburg	Village	554	546	+1.47%	Warren
Haskins	Village	1,245	1,188	+4.80%	Wood
Haviland	Village	160	215	−25.58%	Paulding
Hayesville	Village	447	448	−0.22%	Ashland
Heath	City	10,412	10,310	+0.99%	Licking
Hebron	Village	2,326	2,336	−0.43%	Licking
Helena	Village	211	224	−5.80%	Sandusky
Hemlock	Village	142	155	−8.39%	Perry
Hicksville	Village	3,431	3,581	−4.19%	Defiance
Higginsport	Village	213	251	−15.14%	Brown
Highland	Village	232	254	−8.66%	Highland
Highland Heights	City	8,719	8,345	+4.48%	Cuyahoga
Highland Hills	Village	662	1,130	−41.42%	Cuyahoga
Hilliard	City	37,114	33,672	+10.22%	Franklin
Hills and Dales	Village	250	221	+13.12%	Stark
Hillsboro †	City	6,481	6,605	−1.88%	Highland
Hiram	Village	996	1,406	−29.16%	Portage
Holgate	Village	1,061	1,109	−4.33%	Henry
Holiday City	Village	48	52	−7.69%	Williams
Holland	Village	1,820	1,764	+3.17%	Lucas
Hollansburg	Village	243	227	+7.05%	Darke
Holloway	Village	330	338	−2.37%	Belmont
Holmesville	Village	371	372	−0.27%	Holmes
Hopedale	Village	920	950	−3.16%	Harrison
Hoytville	Village	220	303	−27.39%	Wood
Hubbard	City	7,636	7,289	+4.76%	Trumbull
Huber Heights	City	43,439	38,101	+14.01%	Montgomery, Miami
Hudson	City	23,110	22,262	+3.81%	Summit
Hunting Valley	Village	763	707	+7.92%	Cuyahoga, Geauga
Huntsville	Village	408	431	−5.34%	Logan
Huron	City	6,922	7,149	−3.18%	Erie
Independence	City	7,584	7,133	+6.32%	Cuyahoga
Irondale	Village	326	387	−15.76%	Jefferson
Ironton †	City	10,571	11,129	−5.01%	Lawrence
Ithaca	Village	81	136	−40.44%	Darke
Jackson †	City	6,252	6,397	−2.27%	Jackson
Jackson Center	Village	1,441	1,462	−1.44%	Shelby
Jacksonburg	Village	55	63	−12.70%	Butler
Jacksonville	Village	400	481	−16.84%	Athens
Jamestown	Village	2,052	1,993	+2.96%	Greene
Jefferson †	Village	3,226	3,120	+3.40%	Ashtabula
Jeffersonville	Village	1,258	1,203	+4.57%	Fayette
Jenera	Village	257	221	+16.29%	Hancock
Jeromesville	Village	531	562	−5.52%	Ashland
Jerry City	Village	454	427	+6.32%	Wood
Jerusalem	Village	121	161	−24.84%	Monroe
Jewett	Village	554	692	−19.94%	Harrison
Johnstown	City	5,182	4,632	+11.87%	Licking
Junction City	Village	721	819	−11.97%	Perry
Kalida	Village	1,455	1,542	−5.64%	Putnam
Kelleys Island	Village	256	312	−17.95%	Erie
Kent	City	28,215	28,904	−2.38%	Portage
Kenton †	City	7,947	8,262	−3.81%	Hardin
Kettering	City	57,862	56,163	+3.03%	Montgomery, Greene
Kettlersville	Village	164	179	−8.38%	Shelby
Killbuck	Village	810	817	−0.86%	Holmes
Kingston	Village	1,262	1,032	+22.29%	Ross
Kipton	Village	209	243	−13.99%	Lorain
Kirby	Village	120	118	+1.69%	Wyandot
Kirkersville	Village	471	525	−10.29%	Licking
Kirtland	City	6,937	6,866	+1.03%	Lake
Kirtland Hills	Village	692	646	+7.12%	Lake
Lafayette	Village	406	445	−8.76%	Allen
LaGrange	Village	2,595	2,103	+23.40%	Lorain
Lakeline	Village	216	226	−4.42%	Lake
Lakemore	Village	2,926	3,068	−4.63%	Summit
Lakeview	Village	1,184	1,072	+10.45%	Logan
Lakewood	City	50,942	52,131	−2.28%	Cuyahoga
Lancaster †	City	40,552	38,780	+4.57%	Fairfield
LaRue	Village	676	747	−9.50%	Marion
Latty	Village	165	193	−14.51%	Paulding
Laura	Village	398	474	−16.03%	Miami
Laurelville	Village	512	527	−2.85%	Hocking
Lebanon †	City	20,841	20,033	+4.03%	Warren
Leesburg	Village	1,273	1,314	−3.12%	Highland
Leesville	Village	127	158	−19.62%	Carroll
Leetonia	Village	1,833	1,959	−6.43%	Columbiana
Leipsic	Village	2,177	2,093	+4.01%	Putnam
Lewisburg	Village	1,745	1,820	−4.12%	Preble
Lewisville	Village	184	176	+4.55%	Monroe
Lexington	Village	4,848	4,822	+0.54%	Richland
Liberty Center	Village	1,108	1,180	−6.10%	Henry
Lima †	City	35,579	33,562	+6.01%	Allen
Lincoln Heights	Village	3,144	3,286	−4.32%	Hamilton
Lindsey	Village	457	446	+2.47%	Sandusky
Linndale	Village	108	179	−39.66%	Cuyahoga
Lisbon †	Village	2,597	2,821	−7.94%	Columbiana
Lithopolis	Village	2,134	1,106	+92.95%	Fairfield, Franklin
Lockbourne	Village	236	237	−0.42%	Franklin, Pickaway
Lockington	Village	162	141	+14.89%	Shelby
Lockland	Village	3,514	3,449	+1.88%	Hamilton
Lodi	Village	2,746	2,746	0.00%	Medina
Logan †	City	7,296	7,152	+2.01%	Hocking
London †	City	10,279	9,904	+3.79%	Madison
Lorain	City	65,211	62,371	+4.55%	Lorain
Lordstown	Village	3,332	3,417	−2.49%	Trumbull
Lore City	Village	282	325	−13.23%	Guernsey
Loudonville	Village	2,786	2,641	+5.49%	Ashland, Holmes
Louisville	City	9,521	9,186	+3.65%	Stark
Loveland	City	13,307	12,081	+10.15%	Hamilton, Clermont, Warren
Lowell	Village	565	549	+2.91%	Washington
Lowellville	Village	996	1,155	−13.77%	Mahoning
Lower Salem	Village	75	86	−12.79%	Washington
Lucas	Village	589	615	−4.23%	Richland
Luckey	Village	1,009	1,012	−0.30%	Wood
Ludlow Falls	Village	175	208	−15.87%	Miami
Lynchburg	Village	1,510	1,499	+0.73%	Highland, Clinton
Lyndhurst	City	14,050	14,001	+0.35%	Cuyahoga
Lyons	Village	602	562	+7.12%	Fulton
Macedonia	City	12,168	11,188	+8.76%	Summit
Macksburg	Village	120	186	−35.48%	Washington
Madeira	City	9,487	8,726	+8.72%	Hamilton
Madison	Village	3,435	3,184	+7.88%	Lake
Magnetic Springs	Village	267	268	−0.37%	Union
Magnolia	Village	1,013	978	+3.58%	Stark, Carroll
Maineville	Village	1,405	975	+44.10%	Warren
Malinta	Village	236	265	−10.94%	Henry
Malta	Village	559	671	−16.69%	Morgan
Malvern	Village	1,110	1,189	−6.64%	Carroll
Manchester	Village	1,839	2,023	−9.10%	Adams
Mansfield †	City	47,534	47,821	−0.60%	Richland
Mantua	Village	1,001	1,043	−4.03%	Portage
Maple Heights	City	23,701	23,138	+2.43%	Cuyahoga
Marble Cliff	Village	634	573	+10.65%	Franklin
Marblehead	Village	865	903	−4.21%	Ottawa
Marengo	Village	283	342	−17.25%	Morrow
Mariemont	Village	3,518	3,403	+3.38%	Hamilton
Marietta †	City	13,385	13,653	−1.96%	Washington
Marion †	City	35,999	36,837	−2.27%	Marion
Marseilles	Village	93	112	−16.96%	Wyandot
Marshallville	Village	789	756	+4.37%	Wayne
Martins Ferry	City	6,260	6,915	−9.47%	Belmont
Martinsburg	Village	222	237	−6.33%	Knox
Martinsville	Village	416	463	−10.15%	Clinton
Marysville †	City	25,571	22,094	+15.74%	Union
Mason	City	34,792	26,544	+31.07%	Warren
Massillon	City	32,146	32,149	−0.01%	Stark
Matamoras	Village	702	896	−21.65%	Washington
Maumee	City	13,896	14,286	−2.73%	Lucas
Mayfield	Village	3,356	3,460	−3.01%	Cuyahoga
Mayfield Heights	City	20,351	19,155	+6.24%	Cuyahoga
McArthur †	Village	1,783	1,701	+4.82%	Vinton
McClure	Village	700	725	−3.45%	Henry
McComb	Village	1,558	1,648	−5.46%	Hancock
McConnelsville †	Village	1,667	1,784	−6.56%	Morgan
McDonald	Village	3,172	3,263	−2.79%	Trumbull
McGuffey	Village	466	501	−6.99%	Hardin
Mechanicsburg	Village	1,681	1,644	+2.25%	Champaign
Medina †	City	26,094	26,678	−2.19%	Medina
Melrose	Village	233	275	−15.27%	Paulding
Mendon	Village	628	662	−5.14%	Mercer
Mentor	City	47,450	47,159	+0.62%	Lake
Mentor-on-the-Lake	City	7,131	7,443	−4.19%	Lake
Metamora	Village	566	627	−9.73%	Fulton
Meyers Lake	Village	724	569	+27.24%	Stark
Miamisburg	City	19,923	20,181	−1.28%	Montgomery
Middle Point	Village	566	576	−1.74%	Van Wert
Middleburg Heights	City	16,004	15,946	+0.36%	Cuyahoga
Middlefield	Village	2,748	2,690	+2.16%	Geauga
Middleport	Village	2,208	2,530	−12.73%	Meigs
Middletown	City	50,987	48,694	+4.71%	Butler, Warren
Midland	Village	307	315	−2.54%	Clinton
Midvale	Village	673	754	−10.74%	Tuscarawas
Midway	Village	269	322	−16.46%	Madison
Mifflin	Village	158	137	+15.33%	Ashland
Milan	Village	1,371	1,367	+0.29%	Erie, Huron
Milford	City	6,582	6,709	−1.89%	Clermont, Hamilton
Milford Center	Village	807	792	+1.89%	Union
Millbury	Village	1,193	1,200	−0.58%	Wood
Milledgeville	Village	98	112	−12.50%	Fayette
Miller City	Village	134	137	−2.19%	Putnam
Millersburg †	Village	3,151	3,025	+4.17%	Holmes
Millersport	Village	978	1,044	−6.32%	Fairfield
Millville	Village	634	708	−10.45%	Butler
Milton Center	Village	137	144	−4.86%	Wood
Miltonsburg	Village	42	43	−2.33%	Monroe
Mineral City	Village	652	727	−10.32%	Tuscarawas
Minerva	Village	3,684	3,720	−0.97%	Stark, Carroll, Columbiana
Minerva Park	Village	2,009	1,272	+57.94%	Franklin
Mingo Junction	Village	3,347	3,454	−3.10%	Jefferson
Minster	Village	3,046	2,805	+8.59%	Auglaize, Shelby
Mogadore	Village	3,811	3,853	−1.09%	Summit, Portage
Monroe	City	15,412	12,442	+23.87%	Butler, Warren
Monroeville	Village	1,300	1,400	−7.14%	Huron
Montezuma	Village	152	165	−7.88%	Mercer
Montgomery	City	10,853	10,251	+5.87%	Hamilton
Montpelier	Village	3,942	4,072	−3.19%	Williams
Moraine	City	6,393	6,307	+1.36%	Montgomery
Moreland Hills	Village	3,466	3,320	+4.40%	Cuyahoga
Morral	Village	373	399	−6.52%	Marion
Morristown	Village	248	303	−18.15%	Belmont
Morrow	Village	2,049	1,188	+72.47%	Warren
Moscow	Village	155	185	−16.22%	Clermont
Mount Blanchard	Village	471	492	−4.27%	Hancock
Mount Cory	Village	225	204	+10.29%	Hancock
Mount Eaton	Village	171	241	−29.05%	Wayne
Mount Gilead †	Village	3,503	3,660	−4.29%	Morrow
Mount Healthy	City	6,996	6,098	+14.73%	Hamilton
Mount Orab	Village	4,347	3,664	+18.64%	Brown
Mount Pleasant	Village	394	478	−17.57%	Jefferson
Mount Sterling	Village	1,945	1,782	+9.15%	Madison
Mount Vernon †	City	16,956	16,990	−0.20%	Knox
Mount Victory	Village	601	627	−4.15%	Hardin
Mowrystown	Village	385	360	+6.94%	Highland
Munroe Falls	City	5,044	5,012	+0.64%	Summit
Murray City	Village	341	449	−24.05%	Hocking
Mutual	Village	127	104	+22.12%	Champaign
Napoleon †	City	8,862	8,749	+1.29%	Henry
Nashville	Village	183	197	−7.11%	Holmes
Navarre	Village	1,846	1,957	−5.67%	Stark
Nellie	Village	122	131	−6.87%	Coshocton
Nelsonville	City	5,373	5,392	−0.35%	Athens
Nevada	Village	706	760	−7.11%	Wyandot
Neville	Village	87	100	−13.00%	Clermont
New Albany	City	10,825	7,724	+40.15%	Franklin, Licking
New Alexandria	Village	232	272	−14.71%	Jefferson
New Athens	Village	222	320	−30.63%	Harrison
New Bavaria	Village	86	99	−13.13%	Henry
New Bloomington	Village	413	515	−19.81%	Marion
New Boston	Village	2,297	2,272	+1.10%	Scioto
New Bremen	Village	3,034	2,978	+1.88%	Auglaize
New Carlisle	City	5,559	5,785	−3.91%	Clark
New Concord	Village	2,361	2,491	−5.22%	Muskingum
New Franklin	City	13,877	14,227	−2.46%	Summit
New Holland	Village	804	801	+0.37%	Pickaway, Fayette
New Knoxville	Village	946	879	+7.62%	Auglaize
New Lebanon	Village	3,796	3,995	−4.98%	Montgomery
New Lexington †	Village	4,435	4,731	−6.26%	Perry
New London	Village	2,416	2,461	−1.83%	Huron
New Madison	Village	840	892	−5.83%	Darke
New Miami	Village	2,217	2,249	−1.42%	Butler
New Middletown	Village	1,507	1,621	−7.03%	Mahoning
New Paris	Village	1,494	1,629	−8.29%	Preble
New Philadelphia †	City	17,677	17,288	+2.25%	Tuscarawas
New Richmond	Village	2,727	2,582	+5.62%	Clermont
New Riegel	Village	286	249	+14.86%	Seneca
New Straitsville	Village	652	722	−9.70%	Perry
New Vienna	Village	1,108	1,224	−9.48%	Clinton
New Washington	Village	873	967	−9.72%	Crawford
New Waterford	Village	1,194	1,238	−3.55%	Columbiana
New Weston	Village	124	136	−8.82%	Darke
Newark †	City	49,934	47,573	+4.96%	Licking
Newburgh Heights	Village	1,862	2,167	−14.07%	Cuyahoga
Newcomerstown	Village	3,702	3,822	−3.14%	Tuscarawas
Newton Falls	Village	4,557	4,795	−4.96%	Trumbull
Newtown	Village	2,702	2,672	+1.12%	Hamilton
Ney	Village	303	354	−14.41%	Defiance
Niles	City	18,443	19,266	−4.27%	Trumbull
North Baltimore	Village	3,369	3,432	−1.84%	Wood
North Bend	Village	835	857	−2.57%	Hamilton
North Canton	City	17,842	17,488	+2.02%	Stark
North College Hill	City	9,663	9,397	+2.83%	Hamilton
North Fairfield	Village	465	560	−16.96%	Huron
North Hampton	Village	457	478	−4.39%	Clark
North Kingsville	Village	2,742	2,923	−6.19%	Ashtabula
North Lewisburg	Village	1,636	1,490	+9.80%	Champaign
North Olmsted	City	32,442	32,718	−0.84%	Cuyahoga
North Perry	Village	915	893	+2.46%	Lake
North Randall	Village	954	1,027	−7.11%	Cuyahoga
North Ridgeville	City	35,280	29,465	+19.74%	Lorain
North Robinson	Village	219	205	+6.83%	Crawford
North Royalton	City	31,322	30,444	+2.88%	Cuyahoga
North Star	Village	224	236	−5.08%	Darke
Northfield	Village	3,541	3,677	−3.70%	Summit
Northwood	City	5,160	5,265	−1.99%	Wood
Norton	City	11,673	12,085	−3.41%	Summit
Norwalk †	City	17,068	17,012	+0.33%	Huron
Norwich	Village	87	102	−14.71%	Muskingum
Norwood	City	19,043	19,207	−0.85%	Hamilton
Oak Harbor	Village	2,821	2,759	+2.25%	Ottawa
Oak Hill	Village	1,407	1,551	−9.28%	Jackson
Oakwood	City	9,572	9,202	+4.02%	Montgomery
Oakwood	Village	3,572	3,667	−2.59%	Cuyahoga
Oakwood	Village	546	608	−10.20%	Paulding
Oberlin	City	8,555	8,286	+3.25%	Lorain
Obetz	City	5,489	4,532	+21.12%	Franklin
Octa	Village	58	59	−1.69%	Fayette
Ohio City	Village	651	705	−7.66%	Van Wert
Old Washington	Village	223	279	−20.07%	Guernsey
Olmsted Falls	City	8,582	9,024	−4.90%	Cuyahoga
Ontario	City	6,656	6,225	+6.92%	Richland
Orange	Village	3,421	3,323	+2.95%	Cuyahoga
Orangeville	Village	174	197	−11.68%	Trumbull
Oregon	City	19,950	20,291	−1.68%	Lucas
Orrville	City	8,452	8,380	+0.86%	Wayne
Orwell	Village	1,533	1,660	−7.65%	Ashtabula
Osgood	Village	306	302	+1.32%	Darke
Ostrander	Village	1,094	643	+70.14%	Delaware
Ottawa †	Village	4,456	4,460	−0.09%	Putnam
Ottawa Hills	Village	4,790	4,517	+6.04%	Lucas
Ottoville	Village	966	976	−1.02%	Putnam
Otway	Village	92	87	+5.75%	Scioto
Owensville	Village	786	794	−1.01%	Clermont
Oxford	City	23,035	21,371	+7.79%	Butler
Painesville †	City	20,312	19,563	+3.83%	Lake
Palestine	Village	180	200	−10.00%	Darke
Pandora	Village	1,204	1,153	+4.42%	Putnam
Parma	City	81,146	81,601	−0.56%	Cuyahoga
Parma Heights	City	20,863	20,718	+0.70%	Cuyahoga
Parral	Village	205	218	−5.96%	Tuscarawas
Pataskala	City	17,886	14,962	+19.54%	Licking
Patterson	Village	130	139	−6.47%	Hardin
Paulding †	Village	3,555	3,605	−1.39%	Paulding
Payne	Village	1,192	1,194	−0.17%	Paulding
Peebles	Village	1,774	1,782	−0.45%	Adams
Pemberville	Village	1,326	1,371	−3.28%	Wood
Peninsula	Village	536	565	−5.13%	Summit
Pepper Pike	City	6,796	5,979	+13.66%	Cuyahoga
Perry	Village	1,602	1,663	−3.67%	Lake
Perrysburg	City	25,041	20,623	+21.42%	Wood
Perrysville	Village	729	735	−0.82%	Ashland
Phillipsburg	Village	498	557	−10.59%	Montgomery
Philo	Village	720	733	−1.77%	Muskingum
Pickerington	City	23,094	18,291	+26.26%	Fairfield, Franklin
Piketon	Village	2,111	2,181	−3.21%	Pike
Pioneer	Village	1,429	1,380	+3.55%	Williams
Piqua	City	20,354	20,522	−0.82%	Miami
Pitsburg	Village	381	388	−1.80%	Darke
Plain City	Village	4,065	4,225	−3.79%	Madison, Union
Plainfield	Village	141	157	−10.19%	Coshocton
Pleasant City	Village	400	447	−10.51%	Guernsey
Pleasant Hill	Village	1,241	1,200	+3.42%	Miami
Pleasant Plain	Village	129	154	−16.23%	Warren
Pleasantville	Village	934	960	−2.71%	Fairfield
Plymouth	Village	1,707	1,857	−8.08%	Richland, Huron
Poland	Village	2,463	2,555	−3.60%	Mahoning
Polk	Village	310	336	−7.74%	Ashland
Pomeroy †	Village	1,573	1,852	−15.06%	Meigs
Port Clinton †	City	6,025	6,056	−0.51%	Ottawa
Port Jefferson	Village	308	371	−16.98%	Shelby
Port Washington	Village	548	569	−3.69%	Tuscarawas
Port William	Village	229	254	−9.84%	Clinton
Portage	Village	398	438	−9.13%	Wood
Portsmouth †	City	18,252	20,226	−9.76%	Scioto
Potsdam	Village	225	288	−21.87%	Miami
Powell	City	14,163	13,204	+7.26%	Delaware
Powhatan Point	Village	1,461	1,592	−8.23%	Belmont
Proctorville	Village	523	574	−8.89%	Lawrence
Prospect	Village	1,067	1,112	−4.05%	Marion
Put-in-Bay	Village	154	138	+11.59%	Ottawa
Quaker City	Village	379	502	−24.50%	Guernsey
Quincy	Village	536	706	−24.08%	Logan
Racine	Village	683	675	+1.19%	Meigs
Rarden	Village	146	159	−8.18%	Scioto
Ravenna †	City	11,323	11,724	−3.42%	Portage
Rawson	Village	567	570	−0.53%	Hancock
Rayland	Village	395	417	−5.28%	Jefferson
Reading	City	10,600	10,385	+2.07%	Hamilton
Reminderville	City	5,412	3,404	+58.99%	Summit
Rendville	Village	28	36	−22.22%	Perry
Republic	Village	556	549	+1.28%	Seneca
Reynoldsburg	City	41,076	35,893	+14.44%	Franklin, Licking, Fairfield
Richfield	Village	3,729	3,648	+2.22%	Summit
Richmond	Village	412	481	−14.35%	Jefferson
Richmond Heights	City	10,801	10,546	+2.42%	Cuyahoga
Richwood	Village	2,222	2,229	−0.31%	Union
Ridgeway	Village	314	338	−7.10%	Hardin, Logan
Rio Grande	Village	724	830	−12.77%	Gallia
Ripley	Village	1,591	1,750	−9.09%	Brown
Risingsun	Village	541	606	−10.73%	Wood
Rittman	City	6,131	6,491	−5.55%	Wayne, Medina
Riverlea	Village	599	545	+9.91%	Franklin
Riverside	City	24,474	25,201	−2.88%	Montgomery
Roaming Shores	Village	1,586	1,508	+5.17%	Ashtabula
Rochester	Village	159	182	−12.64%	Lorain
Rock Creek	Village	667	529	+26.09%	Ashtabula
Rockford	Village	1,051	1,120	−6.16%	Mercer
Rocky Ridge	Village	312	417	−25.18%	Ottawa
Rocky River	City	21,755	20,213	+7.63%	Cuyahoga
Rogers	Village	194	237	−18.14%	Columbiana
Rome	Village	83	94	−11.70%	Adams
Roseville	Village	1,746	1,852	−5.72%	Perry, Muskingum
Rossburg	Village	159	201	−20.90%	Darke
Rossford	City	6,299	6,293	+0.10%	Wood
Roswell	Village	219	219	0.00%	Tuscarawas
Rushsylvania	Village	491	516	−4.84%	Logan
Rushville	Village	304	302	+0.66%	Fairfield
Russells Point	Village	1,320	1,391	−5.10%	Logan
Russellville	Village	542	561	−3.39%	Brown
Russia	Village	712	640	+11.25%	Shelby
Rutland	Village	427	393	+8.65%	Meigs
Sabina	Village	2,499	2,654	−5.84%	Clinton
St. Bernard	Village	4,070	4,368	−6.82%	Hamilton
St. Clairsville †	City	5,096	5,184	−1.70%	Belmont
St. Henry	Village	2,596	2,427	+6.96%	Mercer
St. Louisville	Village	352	373	−5.63%	Licking
St. Marys	City	8,397	8,332	+0.78%	Auglaize
St. Paris	Village	1,882	2,089	−9.91%	Champaign
Salem	City	11,915	12,303	−3.15%	Columbiana, Mahoning
Salineville	Village	1,206	1,311	−8.01%	Columbiana
Sandusky †	City	25,095	25,793	−2.71%	Erie
Sarahsville	Village	147	166	−11.45%	Noble
Sardinia	Village	1,083	980	+10.51%	Brown, Highland
Savannah	Village	329	413	−20.34%	Ashland
Scio	Village	673	763	−11.80%	Harrison
Scott	Village	242	286	−15.38%	Van Wert, Paulding
Seaman	Village	973	944	+3.07%	Adams
Sebring	Village	4,191	4,420	−5.18%	Mahoning
Senecaville	Village	422	457	−7.66%	Guernsey
Seven Hills	City	11,720	11,804	−0.71%	Cuyahoga
Seven Mile	Village	712	751	−5.19%	Butler
Seville	Village	2,335	2,296	+1.70%	Medina
Shadyside	Village	3,454	3,785	−8.75%	Belmont
Shaker Heights	City	29,439	28,448	+3.48%	Cuyahoga
Sharonville	City	14,117	13,560	+4.11%	Hamilton, Butler
Shawnee	Village	505	655	−22.90%	Perry
Shawnee Hills	Village	835	681	+22.61%	Delaware
Sheffield	Village	4,135	3,982	+3.84%	Lorain
Sheffield Lake	City	8,957	9,137	−1.97%	Lorain
Shelby	City	9,282	9,317	−0.38%	Richland
Sherrodsville	Village	222	304	−26.97%	Carroll
Sherwood	Village	802	827	−3.02%	Defiance
Shiloh	Village	619	649	−4.62%	Richland
Shreve	Village	1,497	1,514	−1.12%	Wayne
Sidney †	City	20,589	21,229	−3.01%	Shelby
Silver Lake	Village	2,516	2,519	−0.12%	Summit
Silverton	Village	4,908	4,788	+2.51%	Hamilton
Sinking Spring	Village	118	133	−11.28%	Highland
Smithville	Village	1,338	1,252	+6.87%	Wayne
Solon	City	24,262	23,348	+3.91%	Cuyahoga
Somerset	Village	1,796	1,481	+21.27%	Perry
South Amherst	Village	1,581	1,688	−6.34%	Lorain
South Bloomfield	Village	2,143	1,744	+22.88%	Pickaway
South Charleston	Village	1,706	1,693	+0.77%	Clark
South Euclid	City	21,883	22,295	−1.85%	Cuyahoga
South Lebanon	City	6,384	4,115	+55.14%	Warren
South Point	Village	3,836	3,958	−3.08%	Lawrence
South Russell	Village	3,972	3,819	+4.01%	Geauga
South Salem	Village	219	204	+7.35%	Ross
South Solon	Village	329	355	−7.32%	Madison
South Vienna	Village	402	384	+4.69%	Clark
South Webster	Village	670	866	−22.63%	Scioto
South Zanesville	Village	1,894	1,989	−4.78%	Muskingum
Sparta	Village	121	161	−24.84%	Morrow
Spencer	Village	684	753	−9.16%	Medina
Spencerville	Village	2,198	2,223	−1.12%	Allen
Spring Valley	Village	415	479	−13.36%	Greene
Springboro	City	19,062	17,409	+9.50%	Warren, Montgomery
Springdale	City	11,007	11,223	−1.92%	Hamilton
Springfield †	City	58,662	60,608	−3.21%	Clark
Stafford	Village	71	81	−12.35%	Monroe
Steubenville †	City	18,161	18,659	−2.67%	Jefferson
Stockport	Village	483	503	−3.98%	Morgan
Stone Creek	Village	153	177	−13.56%	Tuscarawas
Stoutsville	Village	579	560	+3.39%	Fairfield
Stow	City	34,483	34,837	−1.02%	Summit
Strasburg	Village	2,735	2,608	+4.87%	Tuscarawas
Stratton	Village	267	294	−9.18%	Jefferson
Streetsboro	City	17,260	16,028	+7.69%	Portage
Strongsville	City	46,491	44,750	+3.89%	Cuyahoga
Struthers	City	10,063	10,713	−6.07%	Mahoning
Stryker	Village	1,259	1,335	−5.69%	Williams
Sugar Bush Knolls	Village	217	177	+22.60%	Portage
Sugar Grove	Village	429	426	+0.70%	Fairfield
Sugarcreek	Village	2,373	2,220	+6.89%	Tuscarawas
Summerfield	Village	237	254	−6.69%	Noble
Summitville	Village	110	135	−18.52%	Columbiana
Sunbury	City	6,614	4,389	+50.69%	Delaware
Swanton	Village	3,897	3,690	+5.61%	Fulton, Lucas
Sycamore	Village	793	861	−7.90%	Wyandot
Sylvania	City	19,011	18,965	+0.24%	Lucas
Syracuse	Village	781	826	−5.45%	Meigs
Tallmadge	City	18,394	17,537	+4.89%	Summit, Portage
Tarlton	Village	254	282	−9.93%	Pickaway, Fairfield
Terrace Park	Village	2,355	2,251	+4.62%	Hamilton
The Village of Indian Hill	City	6,087	5,785	+5.22%	Hamilton
Thornville	Village	1,087	991	+9.69%	Perry
Thurston	Village	603	604	−0.17%	Fairfield
Tiffin †	City	17,953	17,963	−0.06%	Seneca
Tiltonsville	Village	1,259	1,372	−8.24%	Jefferson
Timberlake	Village	629	675	−6.81%	Lake
Tipp City	City	10,274	9,689	+6.04%	Miami
Tiro	Village	219	280	−21.79%	Crawford
Toledo †	City	270,871	276,478	−2.03%	Lucas
Tontogany	Village	387	367	+5.45%	Wood
Toronto	City	5,303	5,091	+4.16%	Jefferson
Tremont City	Village	352	375	−6.13%	Clark
Trenton	City	13,021	11,869	+9.71%	Butler
Trimble	Village	329	390	−15.64%	Athens
Trotwood	City	23,070	24,431	−5.57%	Montgomery
Troy †	City	26,305	25,058	+4.98%	Miami
Tuscarawas	Village	1,035	1,056	−1.99%	Tuscarawas
Twinsburg	City	19,248	18,795	+2.41%	Summit
Uhrichsville	City	5,272	5,413	−2.60%	Tuscarawas
Union	City	6,859	6,419	+6.85%	Montgomery, Miami
Union City	Village	1,582	1,666	−5.04%	Darke
Unionville Center	Village	241	233	+3.43%	Union
University Heights	City	13,914	13,539	+2.77%	Cuyahoga
Upper Arlington	City	36,800	33,771	+8.97%	Franklin
Upper Sandusky †	City	6,698	6,596	+1.55%	Wyandot
Urbana †	City	11,115	11,793	−5.75%	Champaign
Urbancrest	Village	1,031	960	+7.40%	Franklin
Utica	Village	2,064	2,132	−3.19%	Licking, Knox
Valley Hi	Village	228	212	+7.55%	Logan
Valley View	Village	1,897	2,034	−6.74%	Cuyahoga
Valleyview	Village	669	620	+7.90%	Franklin
Van Buren	Village	396	328	+20.73%	Hancock
Van Wert †	City	11,092	10,846	+2.27%	Van Wert
Vandalia	City	15,209	15,246	−0.24%	Montgomery
Vanlue	Village	341	359	−5.01%	Hancock
Venedocia	Village	140	124	+12.90%	Van Wert
Vermilion	City	10,659	10,594	+0.61%	Lorain, Erie
Verona	Village	403	494	−18.42%	Preble, Montgomery
Versailles	Village	2,692	2,687	+0.19%	Darke
Vinton	Village	224	222	+0.90%	Gallia
Wadsworth	City	24,007	21,567	+11.31%	Medina
Waite Hill	Village	543	471	+15.29%	Lake
Wakeman	Village	990	1,047	−5.44%	Huron
Walbridge	Village	3,011	3,019	−0.26%	Wood
Waldo	Village	326	338	−3.55%	Marion
Walton Hills	Village	2,033	2,281	−10.87%	Cuyahoga
Wapakoneta †	City	9,957	9,867	+0.91%	Auglaize
Warren †	City	39,201	41,557	−5.67%	Trumbull
Warrensville Heights	City	13,789	13,542	+1.82%	Cuyahoga
Warsaw	Village	634	682	−7.04%	Coshocton
Washington Court House †	City	14,401	14,192	+1.47%	Fayette
Washingtonville	Village	712	801	−11.11%	Columbiana, Mahoning
Waterville	City	6,003	5,523	+8.69%	Lucas
Wauseon †	City	7,568	7,332	+3.22%	Fulton
Waverly †	Village	4,165	4,408	−5.51%	Pike
Wayne	Village	841	887	−5.19%	Wood
Wayne Lakes	Village	693	718	−3.48%	Darke
Waynesburg	Village	925	923	+0.22%	Stark
Waynesfield	Village	749	847	−11.57%	Auglaize
Waynesville	Village	2,669	2,834	−5.82%	Warren
Wellington	Village	4,799	4,802	−0.06%	Lorain
Wellston	City	5,412	5,663	−4.43%	Jackson
Wellsville	Village	3,113	3,541	−12.09%	Columbiana
West Alexandria	Village	1,334	1,340	−0.45%	Preble
West Carrollton	City	13,129	13,143	−0.11%	Montgomery
West Elkton	Village	164	197	−16.75%	Preble
West Farmington	Village	542	499	+8.62%	Trumbull
West Jefferson	Village	4,137	4,222	−2.01%	Madison
West Lafayette	Village	2,417	2,321	+4.14%	Coshocton
West Leipsic	Village	226	206	+9.71%	Putnam
West Liberty	Village	1,770	1,805	−1.94%	Logan
West Manchester	Village	415	474	−12.45%	Preble
West Mansfield	Village	749	682	+9.82%	Logan
West Millgrove	Village	131	174	−24.71%	Wood
West Milton	Village	4,697	4,630	+1.45%	Miami
West Rushville	Village	166	134	+23.88%	Fairfield
West Salem	Village	1,430	1,464	−2.32%	Wayne
West Union †	Village	3,004	3,241	−7.31%	Adams
West Unity	Village	1,763	1,671	+5.51%	Williams
Westerville	City	39,190	36,120	+8.50%	Franklin, Delaware
Westfield Center	Village	1,184	1,115	+6.19%	Medina
Westlake	City	34,228	32,729	+4.58%	Cuyahoga
Weston	Village	1,455	1,590	−8.49%	Wood
Wharton	Village	328	358	−8.38%	Wyandot
Whitehall	City	20,127	18,062	+11.43%	Franklin
Whitehouse	Village	4,990	4,149	+20.27%	Lucas
Wickliffe	City	12,652	12,750	−0.77%	Lake
Wilkesville	Village	116	149	−22.15%	Vinton
Willard	City	6,197	6,236	−0.63%	Huron
Williamsburg	Village	2,570	2,490	+3.21%	Clermont
Williamsport	Village	970	1,023	−5.18%	Pickaway
Willoughby	City	23,959	22,268	+7.59%	Lake
Willoughby Hills	City	10,019	9,485	+5.63%	Lake
Willowick	City	14,204	14,171	+0.23%	Lake
Willshire	Village	405	397	+2.02%	Van Wert
Wilmington †	City	12,664	12,520	+1.15%	Clinton
Wilmot	Village	282	304	−7.24%	Stark
Wilson	Village	129	125	+3.20%	Monroe, Belmont
Winchester	Village	987	1,051	−6.09%	Adams
Windham	Village	1,666	2,209	−24.58%	Portage
Wintersville	Village	3,765	3,924	−4.05%	Jefferson
Woodlawn	Village	3,916	3,294	+18.88%	Hamilton
Woodmere	Village	641	884	−27.49%	Cuyahoga
Woodsfield †	Village	2,210	2,384	−7.30%	Monroe
Woodstock	Village	287	305	−5.90%	Champaign
Woodville	Village	2,006	2,135	−6.04%	Sandusky
Wooster †	City	27,232	26,119	+4.26%	Wayne
Worthington	City	14,786	13,575	+8.92%	Franklin
Wren	Village	165	194	−14.95%	Van Wert
Wyoming	City	8,756	8,428	+3.89%	Hamilton
Xenia †	City	25,441	25,719	−1.08%	Greene
Yankee Lake	Village	75	79	−5.06%	Trumbull
Yellow Springs	Village	3,697	3,487	+6.02%	Greene
Yorkshire	Village	95	96	−1.04%	Darke
Yorkville	Village	968	1,079	−10.29%	Jefferson, Belmont
Youngstown †	City	60,068	64,782	−7.28%	Mahoning (seat), Trumbull
Zaleski	Village	230	278	−17.27%	Vinton
Zanesfield	Village	194	197	−1.52%	Logan
Zanesville †	City	24,765	25,487	−2.83%	Muskingum
Zoar	Village	172	169	+1.78%	Tuscarawas

== See also ==
- Administrative divisions of Ohio
- List of census-designated places in Ohio
- List of cities in the United States
- List of counties in Ohio
- List of townships in Ohio
