= Elmwood Local School District =

School district in Ohio

Coordinates: 41°10′10″N 83°33′10″W

Location
- Bloomdale, Ohio; United States

District information
- Type: Public
- Motto: "Connect Students to the Power and Possibilities of Learning."
- Grades: Pre-K through 12

Other information
- Website: www.elmwood.k12.oh.us

Elmwood Local School District is a school district in Bloomdale, Ohio, United States. The school district serves students who live in the villages of Wayne, Bloomdale, Bairdstown, West Millgrove, Cygnet, and Jerry City located in Wood County. Elmwood is the home of the Royals.

== History ==
Elmwood was created in 1957 when the school districts from Bloomdale, Cygnet, Montgomery, and Portage merged. Bradner was part of the Montgomery district, but refused to join the merger and ultimately wound up with Lakota Local School District in 1959.

== Schools ==
- Elmwood Elementary School
- Elmwood Middle School
- Elmwood High School
