= Edwin Salisbury Carman =

American mechanical engineer (1878-1951)

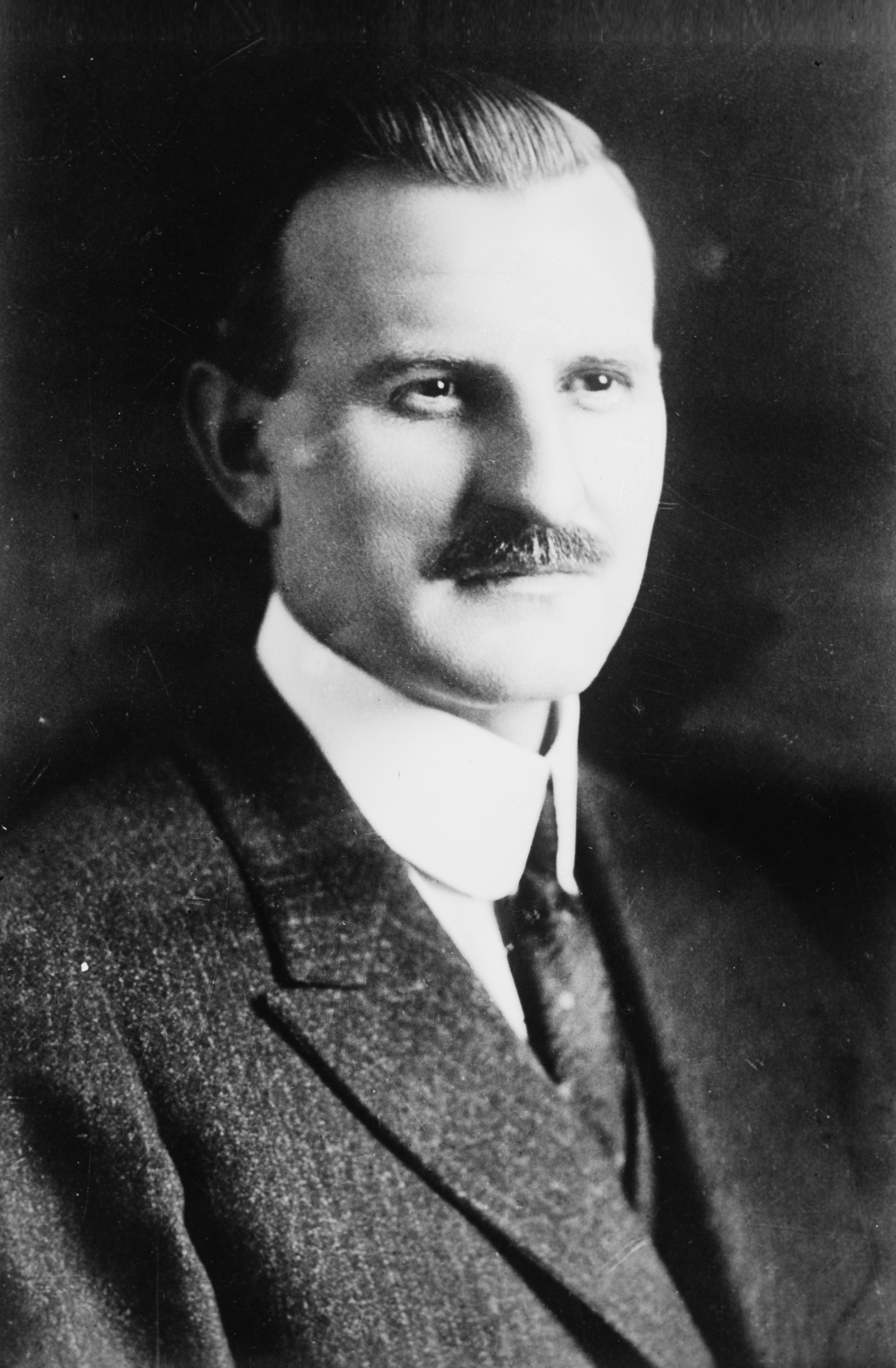
- Edwin S. Carman
- Born: January 31, 1878; Prairie Depot in Wood County, Ohio
- Died: March 20, 1951 (aged 73)
- Occupation: Mechanical engineer

Edwin Salisbury Carman (January 31, 1878 - March 20, 1951) was an American mechanical engineer, founder and head of Edwin S. Carman, Inc., engineers and foundry consultants, and inventor. He was president of the American Society of Mechanical Engineers in the year 1921-22.

== Biography ==
=== Family and education ===
Edwin Salisbury Carman was born at Prairie Depot in Wood County, Ohio as son of Howard Carmen and Minerva Adeline (Bixler) Carman. His grandfather, Thomas S. Carman (1808-1903), had been a physician in Ohio and a pioneer in the early days of the state.

After public school education, he took a commercial course and attended evening classes in engineering at the Cleveland Manual Training School.

=== Career in industry ===
In 1899 Carman started his career in industry at the Sun Oil Company, of Toledo, later Sunoco. In 1903 he joined the American Machine & Manufacturing Co., where he assisted in designing electric cranes, rolling mill equipment and special machinery at the engineering department. In 1905 he was promoted chief engineer in charge of the designing, drafting and estimating departments.

Carman later founded his own construction and consultancy firm, Edwin S. Carman, Inc., engineers and foundry consultants. He was elected president of the American Society of Mechanical Engineers for the year 1921-22.

== Selected publications ==
- E. S. Carman. Foundry Moulding Machines and Pattern Equipment: a Treatise Showing the Progress Made by the Foundries Using Machine Molding Methods. 1920

Patents, a selection

- Patent US1124293 - Casting mechanism for typographs, 1915.
- Patent US1220725 - Mold-making machine, 1917.
- Patent US1476688 - Flask-filling machine, 1923.
- Patent US1631998 - Rotary brush, 1927
- Patent US1739887 - Mechanism for handling sand in foundries, 1929.
