= Jennifer Harris Trosper =

American aerospace engineer

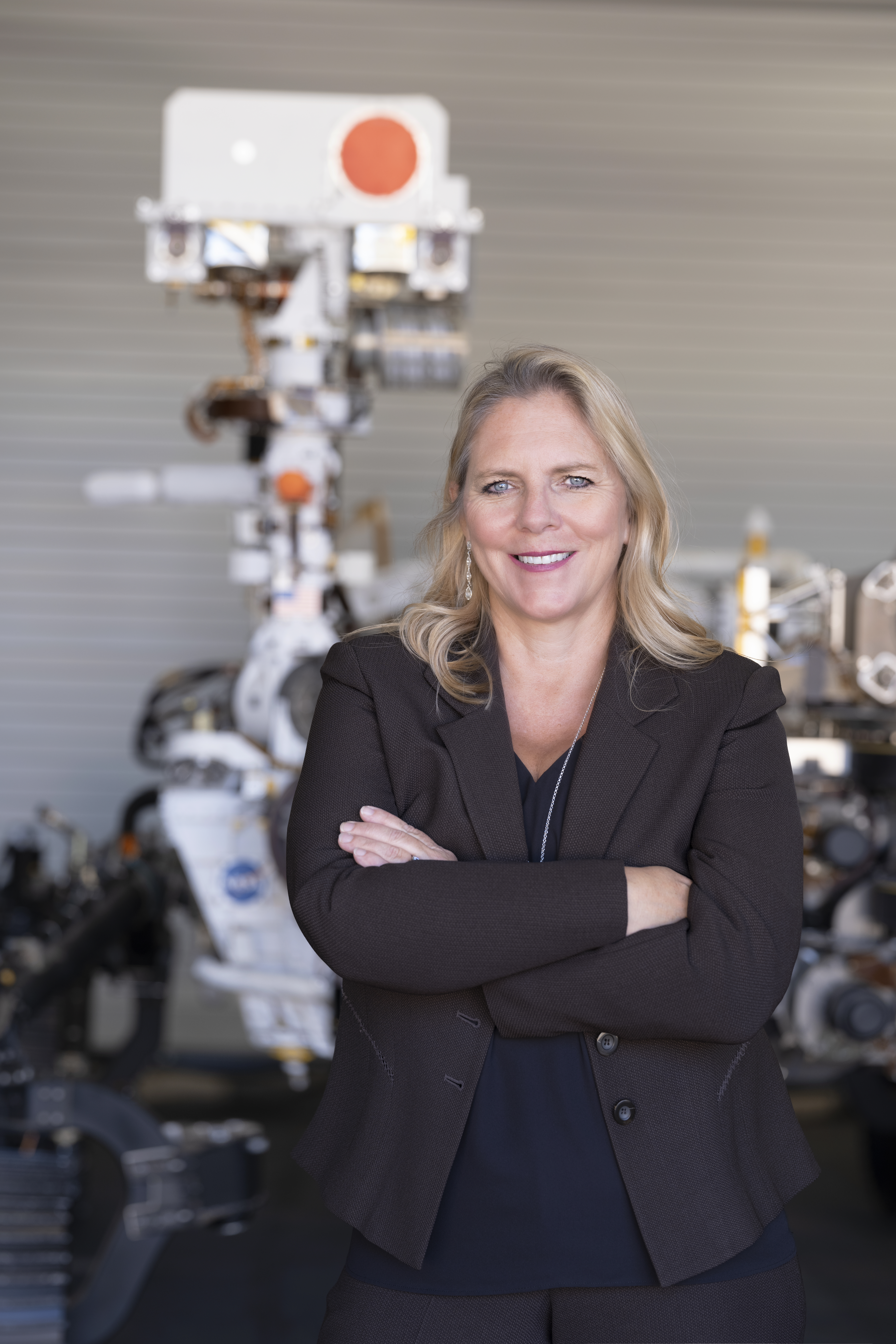
- Jennifer Trosper at JPL in 2021
- Education: MIT (BS – aerospace engineering); USC (MS – aerospace engineering)
- Known for: NASA Project Manager Mars 2020 Perseverance rover
- Spouse: Air Force Lt. Col. (Ret.) Randy Trosper
- Children: 3
- Scientific career
- Institutions: NASA JPL

Jennifer Harris Trosper is an American aerospace engineer at the Jet Propulsion Laboratory (JPL) in Pasadena, California. During her 30-year career at JPL, Trosper has occupied crucial positions in engineering management pertaining to every spacecraft that has traversed the Martian surface. Because of her leadership and engineering expertise, Trosper has appeared on broadcast media outlets as an authority in development and execution of missions to Mars.

== Early years and education ==
Jennifer Trosper grew up in Fostoria, Ohio and graduated from Elmwood High School in Bloomdale, Ohio. She received degrees in aerospace engineering from the Massachusetts Institute of Technology (BS) and the University of Southern California (MS).

== Career ==
During her tenure at the Jet Propulsion Laboratory, Trosper was assigned increasing levels of responsibilities in Mars related missions:

She served as an attitude control operations engineer on the 1997 Cassini mission, and as a testbed and operations engineer as well as flight director for the 1996-97 Mars Pathfinder mission. For the 2001 Mars Odyssey missions, she served as the operations development manager.

In 2003, Trosper became a project system engineer and mission manager for the Mars Exploration Rovers.

During the 2011 Mars Science Laboratory and Curiosity rover expeditions, she served as deputy project manager and mission manager.

For the Mars 2020 Perseverance (rover) mission, Trosper held multiple leadership positions that included mission system development manager, project systems engineering lead, integrated systems engineering lead, and project manager.

== Scientific presentations and media ==
=== Conferences ===
- Trosper, Jennifer (October 25–29, 2021). Plenary Event – Mars 2020: First Step Towards Mars Sample Return. 72nd International Aeronautical Conference. Dubai, United Arab Emirates: International Astronautical Federation.

=== Podcasts ===
- Driven to Mars (December 20, 2021)

=== Radio and television ===
- Jennifer Trosper from Jet Propulsion Lab (October 22, 2014), KHTS (AM), Santa Clarita, CA
- LA Influential: Still Reaching For The Stars – Jennifer Trosper (November 14, 2017), KCAL-TV, Los Angeles, CA
- NASA project lead talks success of Perseverance landing on Mars and what's next (February 19, 2021), Good Morning America
- Roving with Perseverance: Findings from one year on Mars (February 17, 2022), Jet Propulsion Laboratory, Theodore von Kármán Lecture Series

Select appearances on C-SPAN have included:

- Mars Spirit Rover Landing Status (January 3, 2004)
- Mars Rover Missions: Crew Experiences (January 3, 2005)
- Mars Curiosity Rover Mission Update (August 8, 2012)
- End of Mission for Mars Exploration Rover Opportunity (February 13, 2019)
- NASA News Conference on Landing of Mars Rover Perseverance (February 18, 2021)

=== Videos ===
- Curiosity Rover Report: A Taste of Mount Sharp (September 25, 2014). NASA Science – Mars Exploration

=== Feature film ===
- Good Night Oppy – On-screen participant in the 2022 feature-length documentary that tells the story of Mars rovers, Spirit and Opportunity, and their respective 6- and 14-year exploration of the Martian surface.

== Awards and recognition ==
- 12485 jenniferharris (1997 GO1) – An asteroid in the main asteroid belt that was discovered on April 7, 1997, by the NEAT program at the Haleakalā Observatory. It was named for Jennifer Harris Trosper who was flight director for Mars Pathfinder when it landed on July 4, 1997.
- Verizon Academic All-America Hall of Fame (2001), Massachusetts Institute of Technology.
- NASA Jet Propulsion Laboratory Fellow (2013) – "For exceptional leadership and technical expertise in mission operations development and execution for missions to the Martian surface".
- American Society of Civil Engineers Columbia Medal (2024) – "...for a distinguished career working on every rover that has ever driven on Mars..."
