= Jerry City, Ohio =

- Village
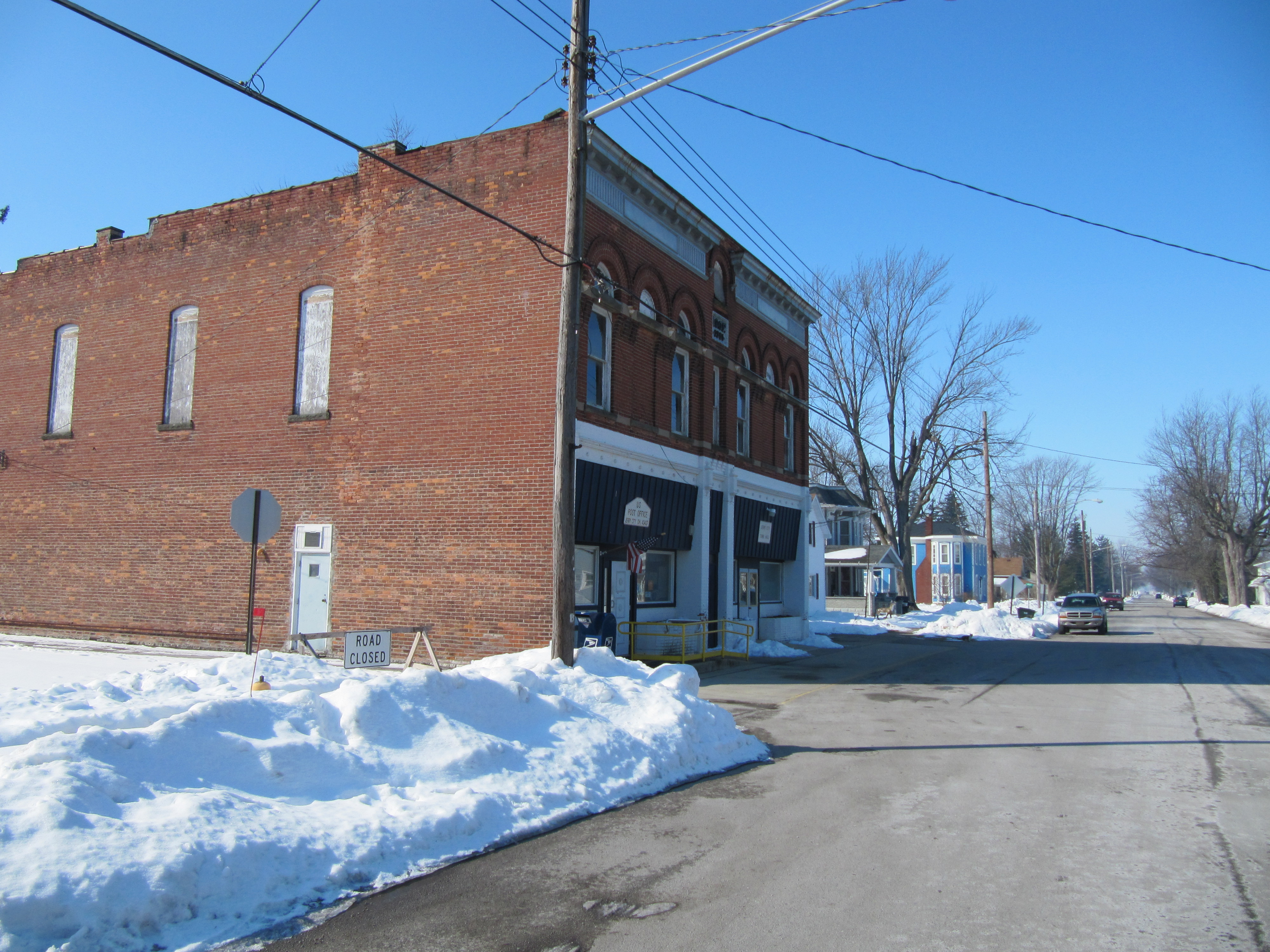
- Main Street in Jerry City, Ohio, showing the local Post Office

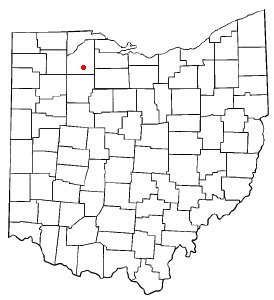
- Location of Jerry City, Ohio

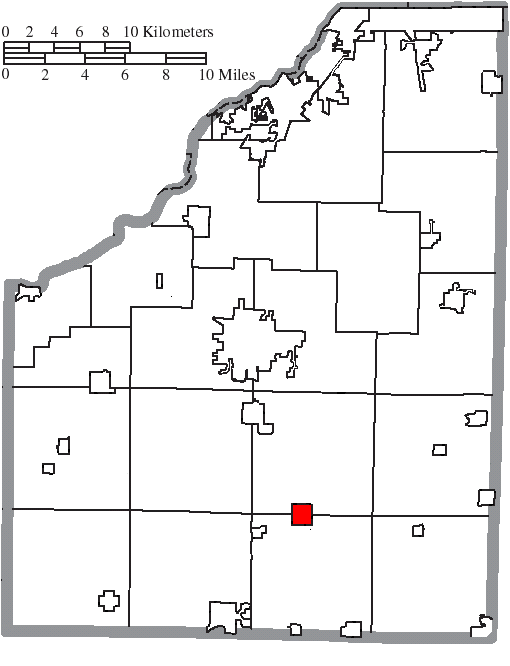
- Location of Jerry City in Wood County
- Coordinates: 41°15′08″N 83°36′08″W
- Country: United States
- State: Ohio
- County: Wood

Area
  - Total: 1.01 sq mi (2.61 km^{2})
  - Land: 1.01 sq mi (2.61 km^{2})
  - Water: 0 sq mi (0.00 km^{2})
- Elevation: 692 ft (211 m)

Population (2020)
  - Total: 454
  - Density: 451/sq mi (174.2/km^{2})
- Time zone: UTC-5 (Eastern (EST))
  - Summer (DST): UTC-4 (EDT)
- ZIP code: 43437
- Area code: 419
- FIPS code: 39-39074
- GNIS feature ID: 2398300

Jerry City is a village in Wood County, Ohio, United States. The population was 454 at the 2020 census.

== History ==
The first settlement at Jerry City was made in the early 1860s; it was then called Stulltown and later Shiloh. The town site was replatted in 1872 as Jerry City, after Jerry Nestlerode, a local businessperson. A post office has been in operation in the village since 1872. The village was incorporated in 1875.

== Geography ==
According to the United States Census Bureau, the village has a total area of 1.01 square miles (2.62 km^{2}), all land.

== Demographics ==
Historical population
Census	Pop.	Note	%±
1880	224		—
1890	530		136.6%
1900	555		4.7%
1910	458		−17.5%
1920	266		−41.9%
1930	292		9.8%
1940	335		14.7%
1950	360		7.5%
1960	386		7.2%
1970	470		21.8%
1980	512		8.9%
1990	517		1.0%
2000	453		−12.4%
2010	427		−5.7%
2020	454		6.3%
U.S. Decennial Census

=== 2010 census ===
As of the census of 2010, there were 427 people, 162 households, and 113 families living in the village. The population density was 422.8 inhabitants per square mile (163.2/km^{2}). There were 173 housing units at an average density of 171.3 per square mile (66.1/km^{2}). The racial makeup of the village was 99.3% White, 0.5% Native American, and 0.2% from other races. Hispanic or Latino of any race were 5.2% of the population.

There were 162 households, of which 34.6% had children under the age of 18 living with them, 53.1% were married couples living together, 9.9% had a female householder with no husband present, 6.8% had a male householder with no wife present, and 30.2% were non-families. 24.1% of all households were made up of individuals, and 11.1% had someone living alone who was 65 years of age or older. The average household size was 2.64 and the average family size was 3.16.

The median age in the village was 37.9 years. 26.5% of residents were under the age of 18; 9.4% were between the ages of 18 and 24; 24.9% were from 25 to 44; 28.2% were from 45 to 64; and 11.2% were 65 years of age or older. The gender makeup of the village was 50.1% male and 49.9% female.

=== 2000 census ===
As of the census of 2000, there were 453 people, 160 households, and 124 families living in the village. The population density was 449.9 inhabitants per square mile (173.7/km^{2}). There were 170 housing units at an average density of 168.8 per square mile (65.2/km^{2}). The racial makeup of the village was 99.56% White, and 0.44% from two or more races. Hispanic or Latino of any race were 1.99% of the population.

There were 160 households, out of which 36.3% had children under the age of 18 living with them, 60.0% were married couples living together, 6.9% had a female householder with no husband present, and 22.5% were non-families. 19.4% of all households were made up of individuals, and 7.5% had someone living alone who was 65 years of age or older. The average household size was 2.83 and the average family size was 3.17.

In the village, the population was spread out, with 28.5% under the age of 18, 8.8% from 18 to 24, 30.5% from 25 to 44, 23.0% from 45 to 64, and 9.3% who were 65 years of age or older. The median age was 33 years. For every 100 females there were 104.1 males. For every 100 females age 18 and over, there were 105.1 males.

The median income for a household in the village was $40,556, and the median income for a family was $46,667. Males had a median income of $33,438 versus $25,000 for females. The per capita income for the village was $16,527. About 5.8% of families and 9.8% of the population were below the poverty line, including 7.7% of those under age 18 and 7.3% of those age 65 or over.

== Education ==
It is in the Elmwood Local School District.
