= Bairdstown, Ohio =

- Village
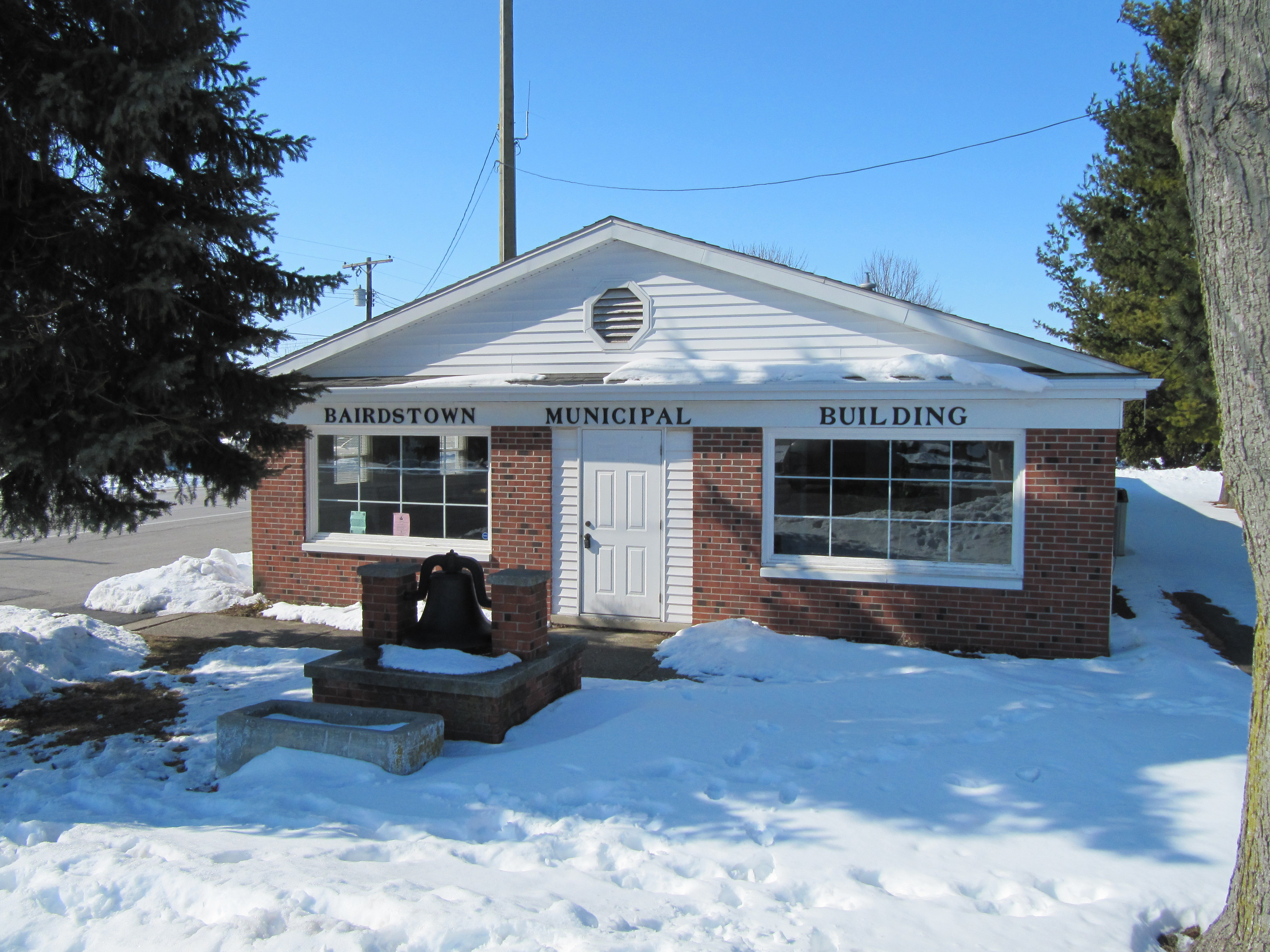
- Municipal building

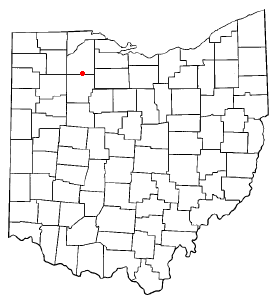
- Location of Bairdstown, Ohio

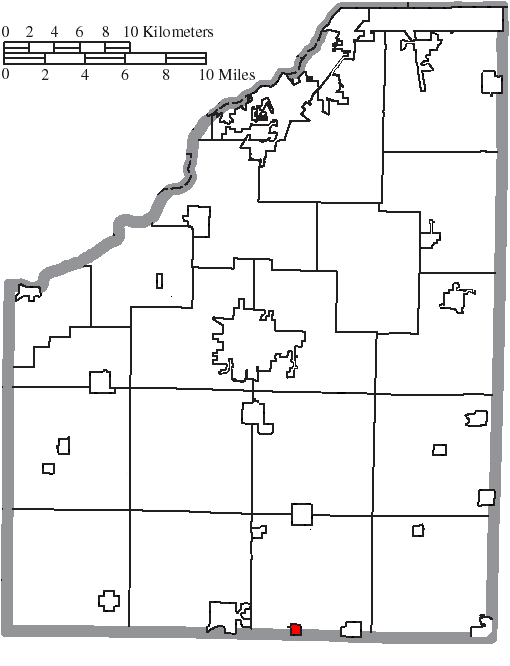
- Location of Bairdstown in Wood County
- Coordinates: 41°10′16″N 83°36′26″W
- Country: United States
- State: Ohio
- County: Wood
- Township: Bloom

Area
  - Total: 0.27 sq mi (0.70 km^{2})
  - Land: 0.27 sq mi (0.70 km^{2})
  - Water: 0 sq mi (0.00 km^{2})
- Elevation: 735 ft (224 m)

Population (2020)
  - Total: 115
  - Estimate (2023): 118
  - Density: 425.2/sq mi (164.16/km^{2})
- Time zone: UTC-5 (Eastern (EST))
  - Summer (DST): UTC-4 (EDT)
- ZIP code: 45872
- Area code: 419
- FIPS code: 39-03646
- GNIS feature ID: 2398018

Bairdstown is a village in Wood County, Ohio, United States. The population was 115 at the 2020 census.

== History ==
Bairdstown was platted in 1874 by Josiah Baird, and named for him. A post office called Bairdstown was established in 1874, and remained in operation until 1940. Bairdstown was incorporated in 1881.

== Geography ==
According to the United States Census Bureau, the village has a total area of 0.27 square miles (0.70 km^{2}), all land.

== Demographics ==
Historical population
Census	Pop.	Note	%±
1890	347		—
1900	298		−14.1%
1910	240		−19.5%
1920	158		−34.2%
1930	172		8.9%
1940	176		2.3%
1950	188		6.8%
1960	182		−3.2%
1970	138		−24.2%
1980	151		9.4%
1990	130		−13.9%
2000	130		0.0%
2010	130		0.0%
2020	115		−11.5%
2023 (est.)	118	▲	2.6%
U.S. Decennial Census

=== 2010 census ===
As of the census of 2010, there were 130 people, 49 households, and 34 families living in the village. The population density was 481.5 inhabitants per square mile (185.9/km^{2}). There were 52 housing units at an average density of 192.6 per square mile (74.4/km^{2}). The racial makeup of the village was 93.8% White and 6.2% from two or more races. Hispanic or Latino of any race were 3.8% of the population.

There were 49 households, of which 32.7% had children under the age of 18 living with them, 44.9% were married couples living together, 18.4% had a female householder with no husband present, 6.1% had a male householder with no wife present, and 30.6% were non-families. 22.4% of all households were made up of individuals, and 8.2% had someone living alone who was 65 years of age or older. The average household size was 2.65 and the average family size was 3.18.

The median age in the village was 42 years. 23.8% of residents were under the age of 18; 7.7% were between the ages of 18 and 24; 24.7% were from 25 to 44; 30.7% were from 45 to 64; and 13.1% were 65 years of age or older. The gender makeup of the village was 53.1% male and 46.9% female.

=== 2000 census ===
As of the census of 2000, there were 130 people, 49 households, and 38 families living in the village. The population density was 486.8 inhabitants per square mile (188.0/km^{2}). There were 53 housing units at an average density of 198.4 per square mile (76.6/km^{2}). The racial makeup of the village was 96.15% White, 0.77% from other races, and 3.08% from two or more races. Hispanic or Latino of any race were 0.77% of the population.

There were 49 households, out of which 24.5% had children under the age of 18 living with them, 63.3% were married couples living together, 10.2% had a female householder with no husband present, and 22.4% were non-families. 18.4% of all households were made up of individuals, and 6.1% had someone living alone who was 65 years of age or older. The average household size was 2.65 and the average family size was 2.97.

In the village, the population was spread out, with 20.8% under the age of 18, 14.6% from 18 to 24, 29.2% from 25 to 44, 19.2% from 45 to 64, and 16.2% who were 65 years of age or older. The median age was 38 years. For every 100 females there were 106.3 males. For every 100 females age 18 and over, there were 106.0 males.

The median income for a household in the village was $42,500, and the median income for a family was $47,500. Males had a median income of $30,000 versus $16,875 for females. The per capita income for the village was $17,276. There were 7.1% of families and 7.6% of the population living below the poverty line, including 12.5% of under eighteens and 18.8% of those over 64.

== Education ==
Almost all of its area is in the Elmwood Local School District. A piece is in the North Baltimore Local School District.
