= Cygnet, Ohio =

- Village
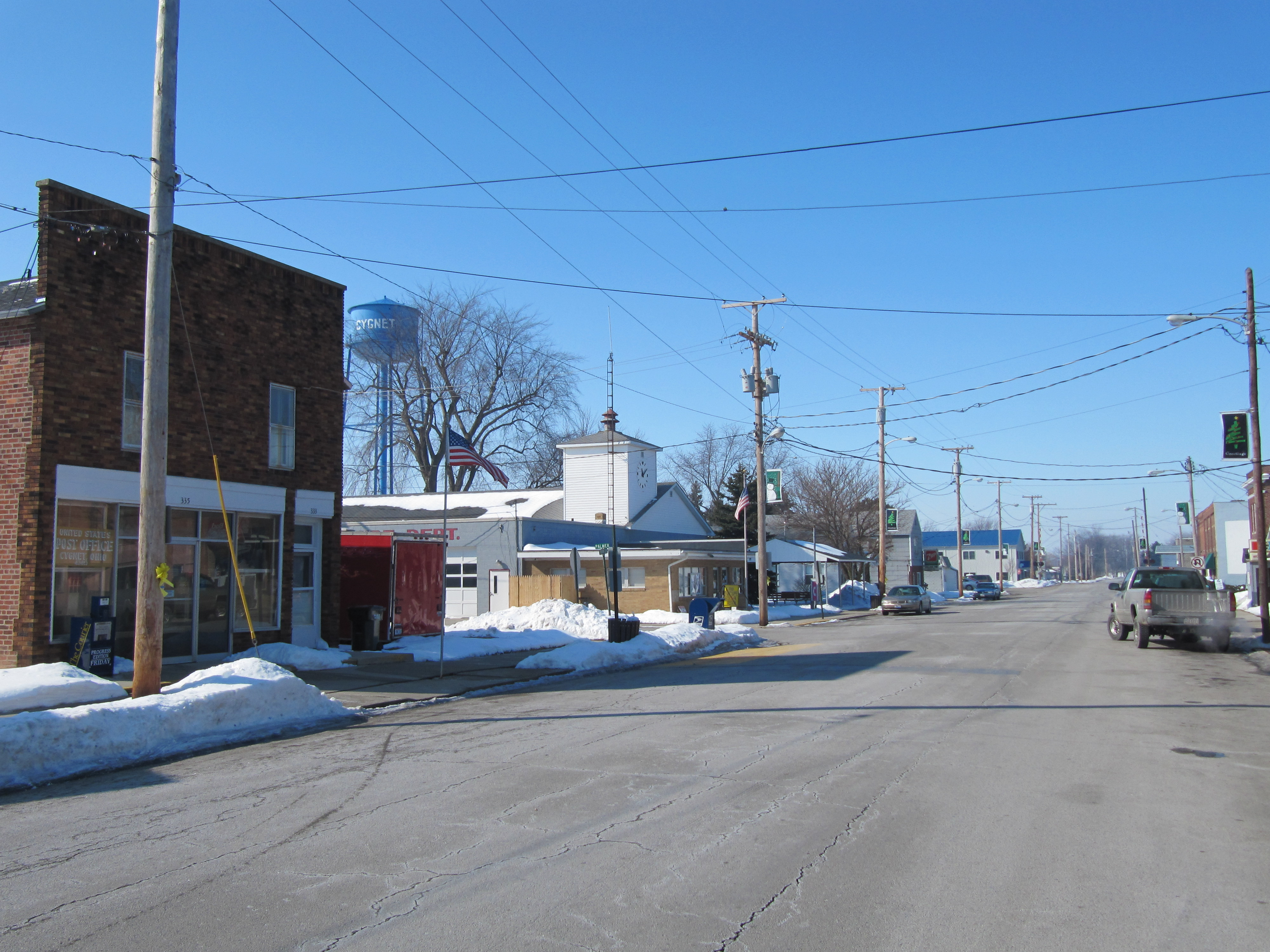
- Front Street downtown

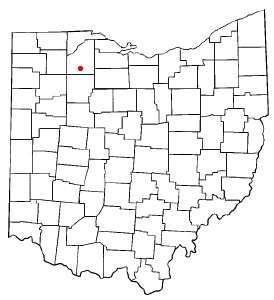
- Location of Cygnet, Ohio

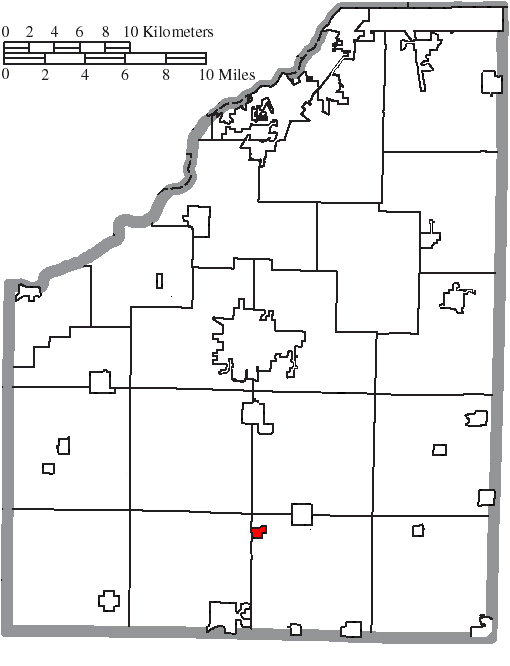
- Location of Cygnet in Wood County
- Coordinates: 41°14′26″N 83°38′37″W
- Country: United States
- State: Ohio
- County: Wood
- Township: Bloom

Government
  - Type: Village Council

Area
  - Total: 0.33 sq mi (0.86 km^{2})
  - Land: 0.33 sq mi (0.86 km^{2})
  - Water: 0 sq mi (0.00 km^{2})
- Elevation: 702 ft (214 m)

Population (2020)
  - Total: 543
  - Estimate (2023): 548
  - Density: 1,639.9/sq mi (633.17/km^{2})
- Time zone: UTC-5 (Eastern (EST))
  - Summer (DST): UTC-4 (EDT)
- ZIP code: 43413
- Area code: 419
- FIPS code: 39-19820
- GNIS feature ID: 2398665

Cygnet (/ˈsɪɡnɛt/ SIG-net) is a village in Wood County, Ohio, United States. The population was 543 at the 2020 census.

== History ==
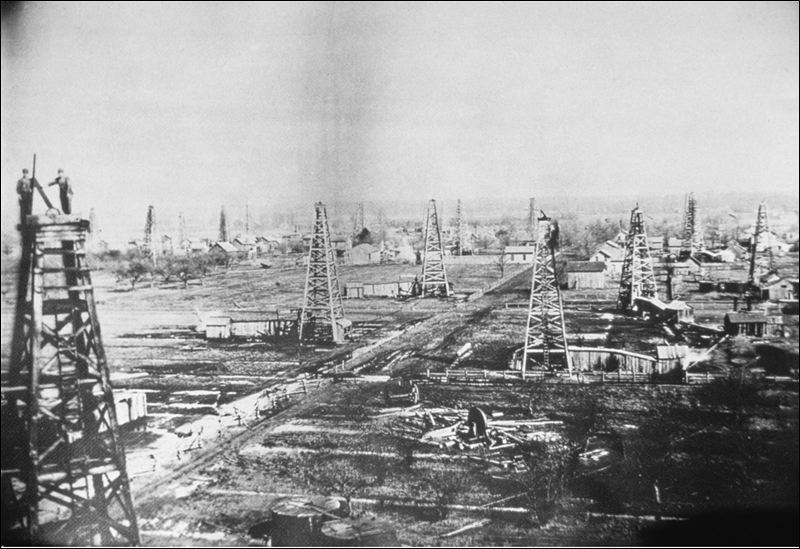
Cygnet during the oil boom.

Cygnet was originally called Pleasant View, and under the latter name was platted in 1883. A post office called Cygnet has been in operation since 1883. The village was incorporated in 1889. Much of the village was damaged by a fire on January 30, 1891. A nitroglycerin explosion occurred in Cygnet on September 7, 1897, killing at least 6 and causing significant damage to the village.

== Geography ==
According to the United States Census Bureau, the village has a total area of 0.33 square miles (0.85 km^{2}), all land.

== Demographics ==
Historical population
| Census | Pop. | Note | %± |
|---|---|---|---|
| 1890 | 670 | | — |
| 1900 | 896 | | 33.7% |
| 1910 | 699 | | −22.0% |
| 1920 | 589 | | −15.7% |
| 1930 | 523 | | −11.2% |
| 1940 | 569 | | 8.8% |
| 1950 | 527 | | −7.4% |
| 1960 | 593 | | 12.5% |
| 1970 | 629 | | 6.1% |
| 1980 | 646 | | 2.7% |
| 1990 | 560 | | −13.3% |
| 2000 | 564 | | 0.7% |
| 2010 | 597 | | 5.9% |
| 2020 | 543 | | −9.0% |
| 2023 (est.) | 548 | ▲ | 0.9% |
U.S. Decennial Census

=== 2010 census ===
As of the census of 2010, there were 597 people, 208 households, and 161 families living in the village. The population density was 1,809.1 inhabitants per square mile (698.5/km^{2}). There were 228 housing units at an average density of 690.9 per square mile (266.8/km^{2}). The racial makeup of the village was 93.6% White, 1.2% African American, 0.7% Native American, 0.7% Asian, 1.3% from other races, and 2.5% from two or more races. Hispanic or Latino of any race were 5.7% of the population.

There were 208 households, of which 43.8% had children under the age of 18 living with them, 55.3% were married couples living together, 13.5% had a female householder with no husband present, 8.7% had a male householder with no wife present, and 22.6% were non-families. 18.3% of all households were made up of individuals, and 8.2% had someone living alone who was 65 years of age or older. The average household size was 2.87 and the average family size was 3.22.

The median age in the village was 33.4 years. 30.3% of residents were under the age of 18; 8.4% were between the ages of 18 and 24; 24.4% were from 25 to 44; 27.8% were from 45 to 64; and 9% were 65 years of age or older. The gender makeup of the village was 47.9% male and 52.1% female.

=== 2000 census ===
As of the census of 2000, there were 564 people, 211 households, and 158 families living in the village. The population density was 1,672.1 inhabitants per square mile (645.6/km^{2}). There were 222 housing units at an average density of 658.1 per square mile (254.1/km^{2}). The racial makeup of the village was 97.16% White, 0.35% African American, 0.35% Native American, 0.71% from other races, and 1.42% from two or more races. Hispanic or Latino of any race were 2.66% of the population.

There were 211 households, out of which 34.6% had children under the age of 18 living with them, 61.6% were married couples living together, 8.1% had a female householder with no husband present, and 25.1% were non-families. 21.8% of all households were made up of individuals, and 9.5% had someone living alone who was 65 years of age or older. The average household size was 2.67 and the average family size was 3.13.

In the village, the population was spread out, with 30.1% under the age of 18, 6.2% from 18 to 24, 31.4% from 25 to 44, 20.7% from 45 to 64, and 11.5% who were 65 years of age or older. The median age was 36 years. For every 100 females there were 102.2 males. For every 100 females age 18 and over, there were 100.0 males.

The median income for a household in the village was $36,538, and the median income for a family was $37,750. Males had a median income of $30,391 versus $25,368 for females. The per capita income for the village was $15,000. About 3.2% of families and 4.6% of the population were below the poverty line, including 2.7% of those under age 18 and 7.4% of those age 65 or over.

== Education ==
It is in the Elmwood Local School District.
