= West Millgrove, Ohio =

- Village
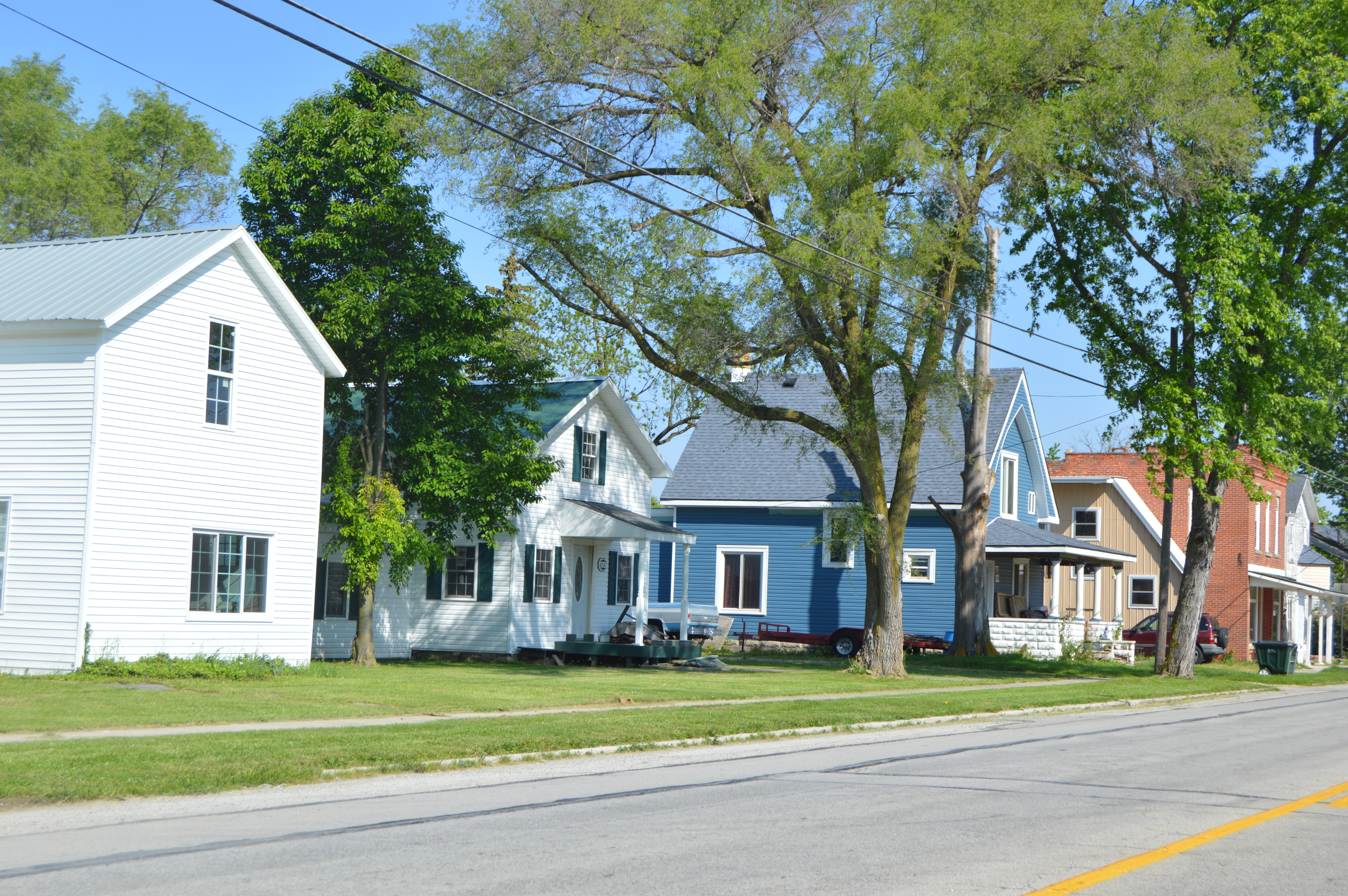
- Houses on State Route 199

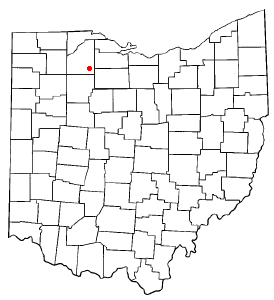
- Location of West Millgrove, Ohio

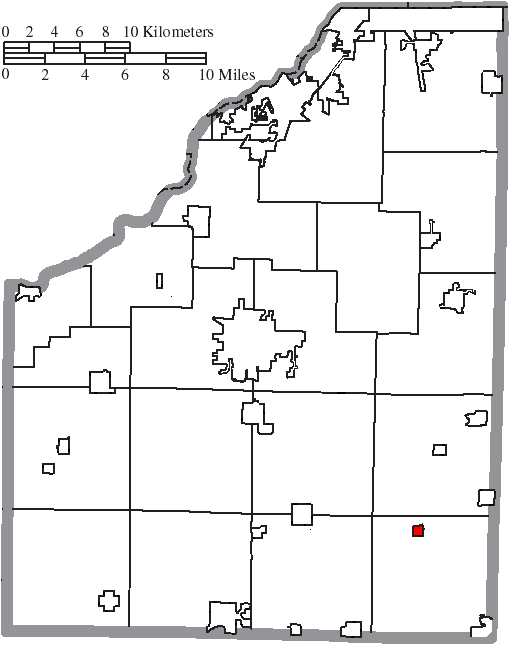
- Location of West Millgrove in Wood County
- Coordinates: 41°14′34″N 83°29′29″W
- Country: United States
- State: Ohio
- County: Wood
- Township: Perry

Area
  - Total: 0.26 sq mi (0.67 km^{2})
  - Land: 0.26 sq mi (0.67 km^{2})
  - Water: 0 sq mi (0.00 km^{2})
- Elevation: 712 ft (217 m)

Population (2020)
  - Total: 131
  - Density: 503.9/sq mi (194.55/km^{2})
- Time zone: UTC-5 (Eastern (EST))
  - Summer (DST): UTC-4 (EDT)
- ZIP code: 43467
- Area code: 419
- FIPS code: 39-83888
- GNIS feature ID: 2400139

West Millgrove is a village in Wood County, Ohio, United States. The population was 131 at the 2020 census.

== History ==
West Millgrove was originally called Millgrove, and under the latter name was platted in 1835. A post office called West Mill Grove was established in 1837, and the spelling was changed to West Millgrove in 1895. The village was incorporated in 1874.

== Geography ==
According to the United States Census Bureau, the village has a total area of 0.26 square miles (0.67 km^{2}), all land.

== Demographics ==
Historical population
| Census | Pop. | Note | %± |
|---|---|---|---|
| 1880 | 222 | | — |
| 1890 | 207 | | −6.8% |
| 1900 | 236 | | 14.0% |
| 1910 | 191 | | −19.1% |
| 1920 | 132 | | −30.9% |
| 1930 | 158 | | 19.7% |
| 1940 | 197 | | 24.7% |
| 1950 | 180 | | −8.6% |
| 1960 | 196 | | 8.9% |
| 1970 | 215 | | 9.7% |
| 1980 | 205 | | −4.7% |
| 1990 | 171 | | −16.6% |
| 2000 | 78 | | −54.4% |
| 2010 | 174 | | 123.1% |
| 2020 | 131 | | −24.7% |
U.S. Decennial Census

=== 2010 census ===
As of the census of 2010, there were 174 people, 64 households, and 43 families living in the village. The population density was 669.2 inhabitants per square mile (258.4/km^{2}). There were 70 housing units at an average density of 269.2 per square mile (103.9/km^{2}). The racial makeup of the village was 96.0% White, 0.6% from other races, and 3.4% from two or more races. Hispanic or Latino of any race were 1.7% of the population.

There were 64 households, of which 37.5% had children under the age of 18 living with them, 35.9% were married couples living together, 23.4% had a female householder with no husband present, 7.8% had a male householder with no wife present, and 32.8% were non-families. 31.3% of all households were made up of individuals, and 12.5% had someone living alone who was 65 years of age or older. The average household size was 2.72 and the average family size was 3.37.

The median age in the village was 32 years. 31% of residents were under the age of 18; 9.2% were between the ages of 18 and 24; 25.3% were from 25 to 44; 24.6% were from 45 to 64; and 9.8% were 65 years of age or older. The gender makeup of the village was 43.7% male and 56.3% female.

=== 2000 census ===
As of the census of 2000, there were 78 people, 25 households, and 22 families living in the village. The population density was 300.5 inhabitants per square mile (116.0/km^{2}). There were 28 housing units at an average density of 107.9 per square mile (41.7/km^{2}). The racial makeup of the village was 100.00% White.

There were 25 households, out of which 44.0% had children under the age of 18 living with them, 72.0% were married couples living together, 12.0% had a female householder with no husband present, and 12.0% were non-families. 12.0% of all households were made up of individuals, and 4.0% had someone living alone who was 65 years of age or older. The average household size was 3.12 and the average family size was 3.18.

In the village, the population was spread out, with 35.9% under the age of 18, 5.1% from 18 to 24, 28.2% from 25 to 44, 15.4% from 45 to 64, and 15.4% who were 65 years of age or older. The median age was 31 years. For every 100 females there were 100.0 males. For every 100 females age 18 and over, there were 100.0 males.

The median income for a household in the village was $50,625, and the median income for a family was $51,875. Males had a median income of $41,250 versus $28,750 for females. The per capita income for the village was $12,578. There were 4.5% of families and 10.1% of the population living below the poverty line, including 2.6% of under eighteens and none of those over 64.

== Education ==
It is in the Elmwood Local School District.
