= Bradner, Ohio =

- Village
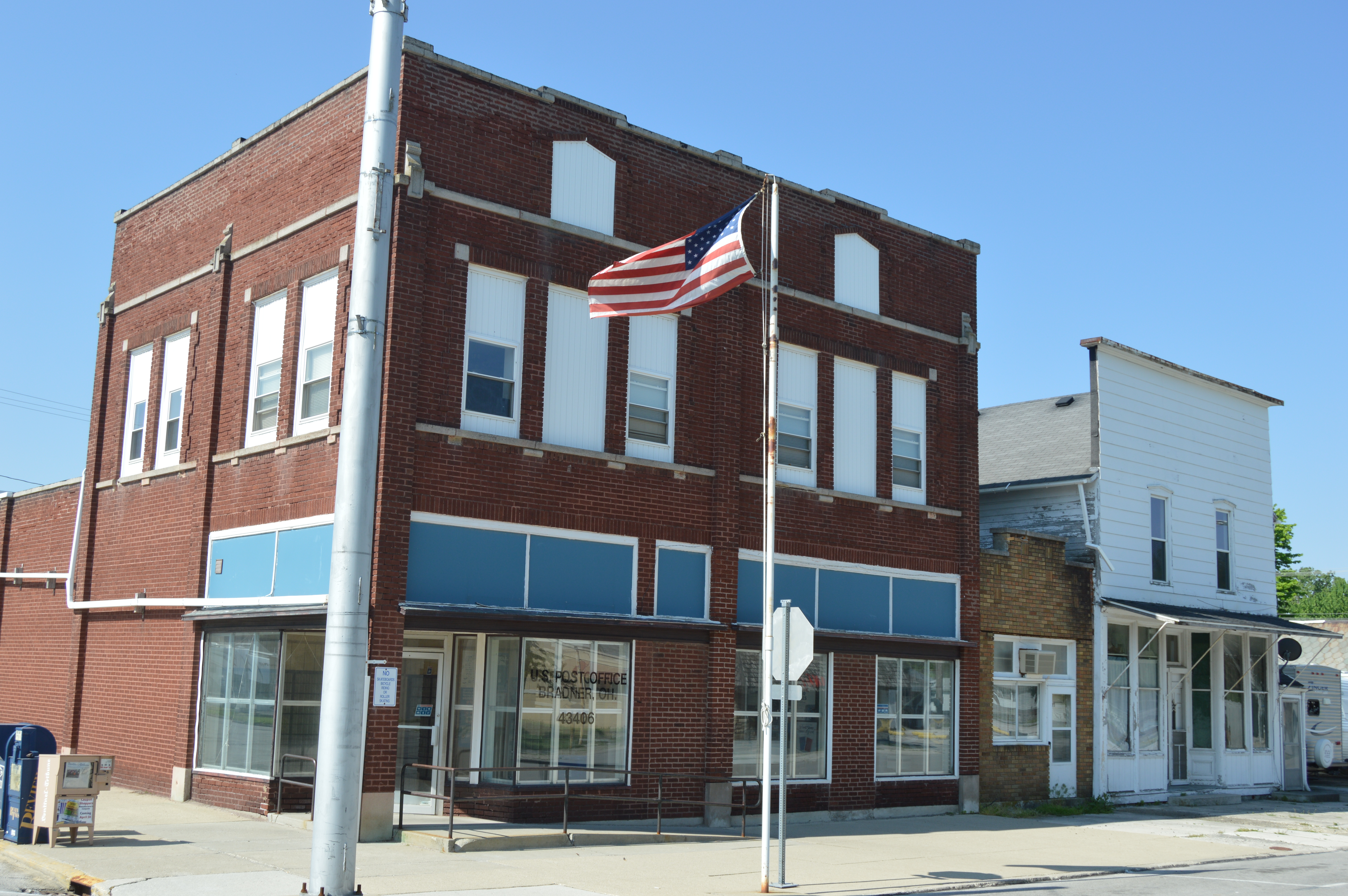
- Crocker Street downtown

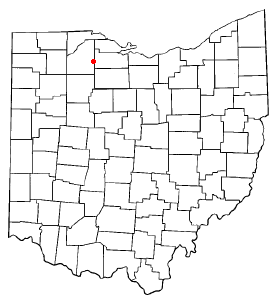
- Location of Bradner, Ohio

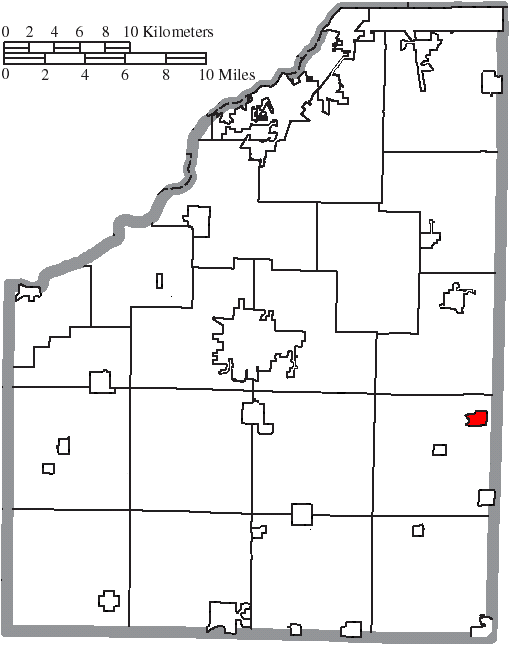
- Location of Bradner in Wood County
- Coordinates: 41°19′25″N 83°26′11″W
- Country: United States
- State: Ohio
- County: Wood
- Township: Montgomery
- Established: 1876

Area
  - Total: 0.62 sq mi (1.60 km^{2})
  - Land: 0.62 sq mi (1.60 km^{2})
  - Water: 0.0039 sq mi (0.01 km^{2})
- Elevation: 702 ft (214 m)

Population (2020)
  - Total: 971
  - Estimate (2023): 979
  - Density: 1,575.3/sq mi (608.21/km^{2})
- Time zone: UTC-5 (Eastern (EST))
  - Summer (DST): UTC-4 (EDT)
- ZIP code: 43406
- Area code: 419
- FIPS code: 39-08112
- GNIS feature ID: 2398165
- Website: https://bradnerohio.org/

Bradner is a village in Wood County, Ohio, United States. The population was 971 at the 2020 census.

== History ==
Bradner was platted in 1875, and named for John Bradner, proprietor. A post office called Bradner has been in operation since 1876. The village was incorporated in 1889.

== Geography ==
According to the United States Census Bureau, the village has a total area of 0.62 square miles (1.61 km^{2}), all land.

== Demographics ==
Historical population
Census	Pop.	Note	%±
1880	281		—
1890	441		56.9%
1900	1,148		160.3%
1910	890		−22.5%
1920	786		−11.7%
1930	836		6.4%
1940	890		6.5%
1950	924		3.8%
1960	994		7.6%
1970	1,140		14.7%
1980	1,175		3.1%
1990	1,093		−7.0%
2000	1,171		7.1%
2010	985		−15.9%
2020	971		−1.4%
2023 (est.)	979	▲	0.8%
U.S. Decennial Census

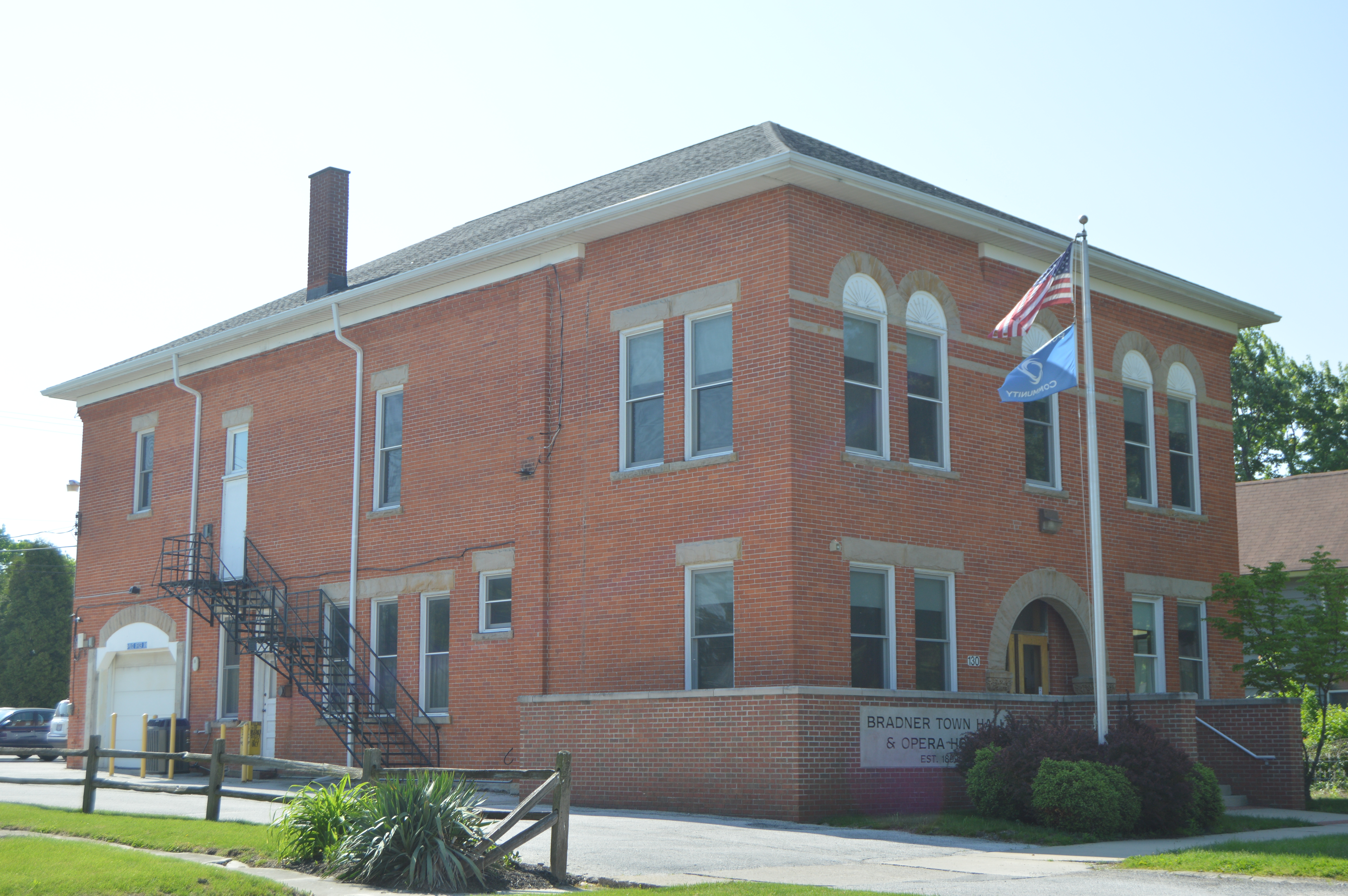
Bradner Village Hall and opera house

=== 2010 census ===
As of the census of 2010, there were 985 people, 388 households, and 265 families living in the village. The population density was 1,588.7 inhabitants per square mile (613.4/km^{2}). There were 445 housing units at an average density of 717.7 per square mile (277.1/km^{2}). The racial makeup of the village was 97.2% White, 0.4% African American, 0.1% Native American, 0.3% Asian, 0.5% from other races, and 1.5% from two or more races. Hispanic or Latino of any race were 5.1% of the population.

There were 388 households, of which 36.9% had children under the age of 18 living with them, 47.7% were married couples living together, 16.5% had a female householder with no husband present, 4.1% had a male householder with no wife present, and 31.7% were non-families. 25.0% of all households were made up of individuals, and 10.3% had someone living alone who was 65 years of age or older. The average household size was 2.54 and the average family size was 2.98.

The median age in the village was 35.3 years. 25.4% of residents were under the age of 18; 8.6% were between the ages of 18 and 24; 29.7% were from 25 to 44; 24.7% were from 45 to 64; and 11.6% were 65 years of age or older. The gender makeup of the village was 50.7% male and 49.3% female.

=== 2000 census ===
As of the census of 2000, there were 1,171 people, 445 households, and 322 families living in the village. The population density was 1,915.5 inhabitants per square mile (739.6/km^{2}). There were 454 housing units at an average density of 742.6 per square mile (286.7/km^{2}). The racial makeup of the village was 98.80% White, 0.17% Native American, 0.09% Asian, 0.43% from other races, and 0.51% from two or more races. Hispanic or Latino of any race were 2.65% of the population.

There were 445 households, out of which 35.1% had children under the age of 18 living with them, 56.4% were married couples living together, 11.5% had a female householder with no husband present, and 27.6% were non-families. 23.8% of all households were made up of individuals, and 9.7% had someone living alone who was 65 years of age or older. The average household size was 2.63 and the average family size was 3.09.

In the village, the population was spread out, with 29.0% under the age of 18, 8.3% from 18 to 24, 28.4% from 25 to 44, 22.3% from 45 to 64, and 12.0% who were 65 years of age or older. The median age was 35 years. For every 100 females there were 99.1 males. For every 100 females age 18 and over, there were 95.5 males.

The median income for a household in the village was $35,521, and the median income for a family was $40,350. Males had a median income of $33,472 versus $21,719 for females. The per capita income for the village was $15,000. About 9.8% of families and 12.2% of the population were below the poverty line, including 19.9% of those under age 18 and 3.2% of those age 65 or over.

== Education ==
Almost all of its area is in the Lakota Local School District.
