= Wayne, Ohio =

- Village
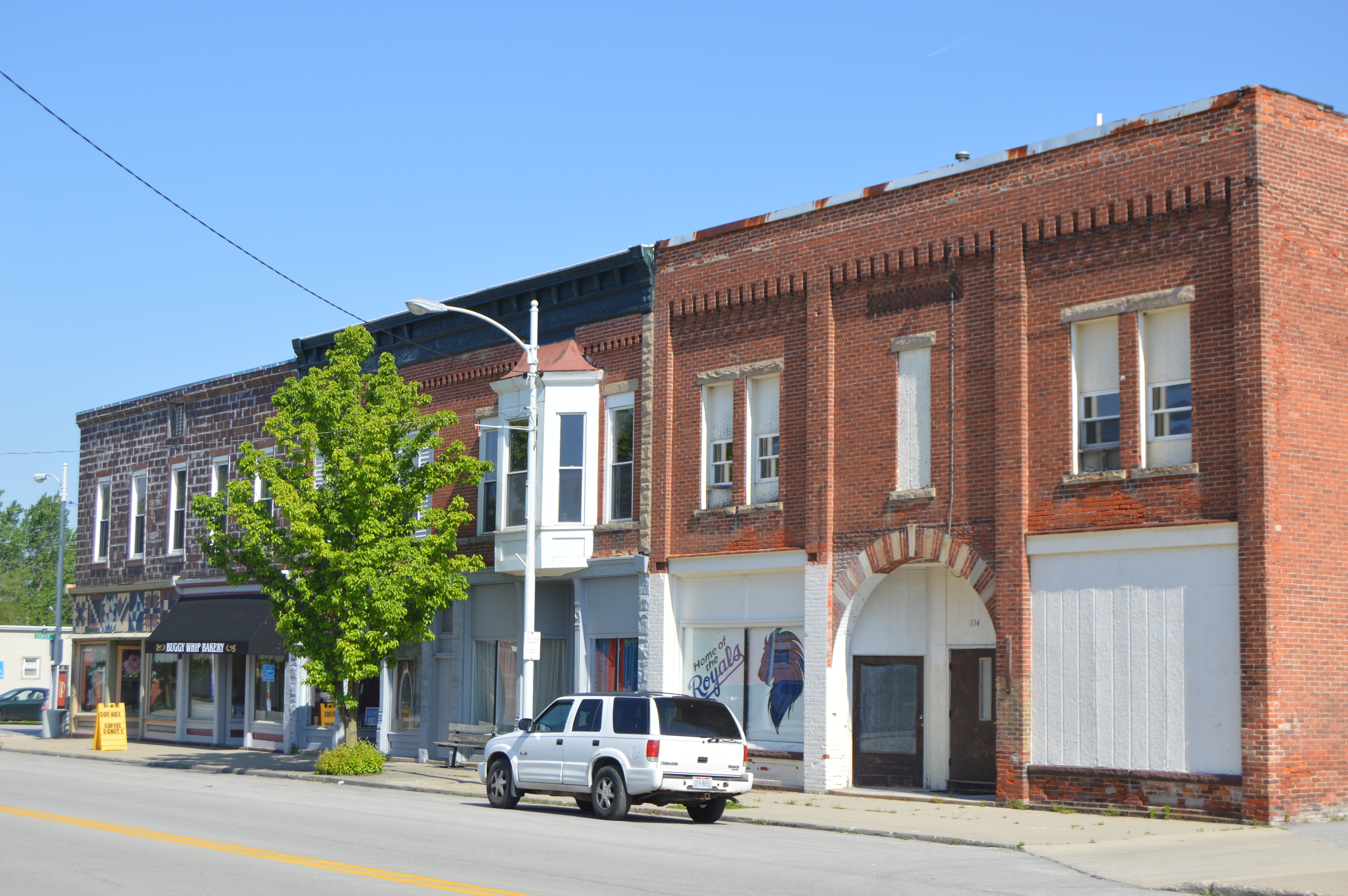
- Main Street downtown

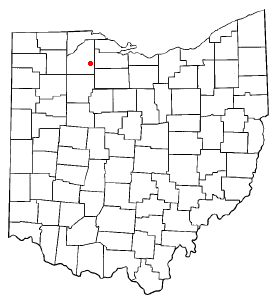
- Location of Wayne, Ohio

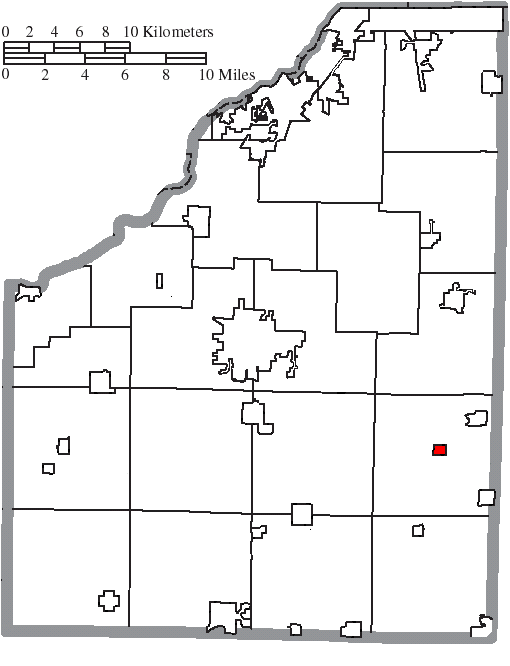
- Location of Wayne in Wood County
- Coordinates: 41°18′03″N 83°28′18″W
- Country: United States
- State: Ohio
- County: Wood
- Township: Montgomery

Area
  - Total: 0.32 sq mi (0.83 km^{2})
  - Land: 0.32 sq mi (0.83 km^{2})
  - Water: 0 sq mi (0.00 km^{2})
- Elevation: 702 ft (214 m)

Population (2020)
  - Total: 841
  - Density: 2,610.5/sq mi (1,007.92/km^{2})
- Time zone: UTC-5 (Eastern (EST))
  - Summer (DST): UTC-4 (EDT)
- ZIP code: 43466
- Area code: 419
- FIPS code: 39-82334
- GNIS feature ID: 2400111
- Website: https://wayneohio.us/

Wayne is a village in Wood County, Ohio, United States. The population was 841 at the 2020 census.

== History ==
Wayne was originally called Freeport, and under the latter name was platted in 1836. Another early variant name was Prairie Depot. The present name honors Anthony Wayne. The village was incorporated in 1836. A post office called Prairie Depot was established in 1852, and the name was changed to Wayne in 1927.

== Geography ==
According to the United States Census Bureau, the village has a total area of 0.32 square miles (0.83 km^{2}), all land.

== Demographics ==
Historical population
Census	Pop.	Note	%±
1900	815		—
1910	733		−10.1%
1920	578		−21.1%
1930	606		4.8%
1940	626		3.3%
1950	761		21.6%
1960	949		24.7%
1970	921		−3.0%
1980	894		−2.9%
1990	803		−10.2%
2000	842		4.9%
2010	887		5.3%
2020	841		−5.2%
U.S. Decennial Census

=== 2010 census ===
As of the census of 2010, there were 887 people, 324 households, and 231 families living in the village. The population density was 2,771.9 inhabitants per square mile (1,070.2/km^{2}). There were 362 housing units at an average density of 1,131.3 per square mile (436.8/km^{2}). The racial makeup of the village was 94.5% White, 0.2% African American, 0.2% Native American, 2.5% from other races, and 2.6% from two or more races. Hispanic or Latino of any race were 6.0% of the population.

There were 324 households, of which 43.5% had children under the age of 18 living with them, 48.5% were married couples living together, 16.0% had a female householder with no husband present, 6.8% had a male householder with no wife present, and 28.7% were non-families. 21.6% of all households were made up of individuals, and 8.7% had someone living alone who was 65 years of age or older. The average household size was 2.74 and the average family size was 3.17.

The median age in the village was 32.3 years. 29.5% of residents were under the age of 18; 10% were between the ages of 18 and 24; 28% were from 25 to 44; 22.6% were from 45 to 64; and 10% were 65 years of age or older. The gender makeup of the village was 48.1% male and 51.9% female.

=== 2000 census ===
As of the census of 2000, there were 842 people, 313 households, and 230 families living in the village. The population density was 2,613.7 inhabitants per square mile (1,009.2/km^{2}). There were 336 housing units at an average density of 1,043.0 per square mile (402.7/km^{2}). The racial makeup of the village was 95.13% White, 0.36% African American, 0.48% Native American, 0.12% Asian, 2.02% from other races, and 1.90% from two or more races. Hispanic or Latino of any race were 3.56% of the population.

25.2% of the total population were of French descent.

There were 313 households, out of which 38.7% had children under the age of 18 living with them, 57.8% were married couples living together, 10.5% had a female householder with no husband present, and 26.5% were non-families. 20.1% of all households were made up of individuals, and 9.3% had someone living alone who was 65 years of age or older. The average household size was 2.69 and the average family size was 3.07.

In the village, the population was spread out, with 28.3% under the age of 18, 7.8% from 18 to 24, 32.9% from 25 to 44, 20.1% from 45 to 64, and 10.9% who were 65 years of age or older. The median age was 34 years. For every 100 females there were 99.1 males. For every 100 females age 18 and over, there were 94.2 males.

The median income for a household in the village was $46,071, and the median income for a family was $52,750. Males had a median income of $34,135 versus $22,386 for females. The per capita income for the village was $17,028. About 7.0% of families and 7.6% of the population were below the poverty line, including 9.6% of those under age 18 and none of those age 65 or over.

== Education ==
It is in the Elmwood Local School District.

== Library ==
Wayne is served by the Wayne Public Library. In 2005, the library loaned more than 97,000 items to its cardholders. Total holdings as of 2005 were over 39,000 volumes with over 120 periodical subscriptions.
