= Ohio's 19th House of Representatives district =

American legislative district

Ohio's 19th State House of Representatives district
Representative
Phil Robinson; D–Solon
- Population (2020): 123,250

Ohio's 19th House of Representatives district is currently represented by Democrat Phil Robinson. It is located entirely within Cuyahoga County and includes the municipalities of Bedford, Bedford Heights, Bentleyville, Brecksville, Chagrin Falls, Chagrin Falls Township, Cuyahoga Heights, Glenwillow, Hunting Valley, Independence, Mayfield Heights, Moreland Hills, Newburgh Heights, Orange, Pepper Pike, Solon, Valley View, Walton Hills, Woodmere, and part of Cleveland.

== List of members representing the district ==
Member	Party	Years	General Assembly	Electoral history
District established January 2, 1967.
John McDonald (Newark)	Democratic	January 2, 1967 – December 31, 1970	107th 108th	Elected in 1966. Re-elected in 1968. Retired to run for Ohio Attorney General.
Raymond Luther (Newark)	Republican	January 4, 1971 – December 31, 1972	109th	Elected in 1970. Redistricted to the 1st district.
Richard Finan (Cincinnati)	Republican	January 1, 1973 – September 14, 1978	110th 111th 112th	Elected in 1972. Re-elected in 1974. Re-elected in 1976. Resigned to become state senator.
Dale N. Van Vyven (Sharonville)	Republican	September 14, 1978 – December 31, 1982	112th 113th 114th	Appointed to finish Finan's term. Re-elected in 1978. Re-elected in 1980. Redistricted to the 27th district.
Ron Suster (Euclid)	Democratic	January 3, 1983 – December 31, 1992	115th 116th 117th 118th 119th	Redistricted from the 18th district and re-elected in 1982. Re-elected in 1984. Re-elected in 1986. Re-elected in 1988. Re-elected in 1990. Redistricted to the 14th district.
Patrick Sweeney (Cleveland)	Democratic	January 4, 1993 – January 6, 1997	120th 121st 122nd	Redistricted from the 9th district and re-elected in 1992. Re-elected in 1994. Re-elected in 1996. Resigned to become state senator.
Vacant		January 6, 1997 – January 7, 1997	122nd	
Dale Miller (Cleveland)	Democratic	January 7, 1997 – December 31, 2002	122nd 123rd 124th	Appointed to finish Sweeney's term. Re-elected in 1998. Re-elected in 2000. Redistricted to the 14th district.
Larry L. Flowers (Canal Winchester)	Republican	January 6, 2003 – December 31, 2008	125th 126th 127th	Redistricted from the 24th district and re-elected in 2002. Re-elected in 2004. Re-elected in 2006. Term-limited.
Marian Harris (Columbus)	Democratic	January 5, 2009 – December 31, 2010	128th	Elected in 2008. Lost re-election.
Anne Gonzales (Westerville)	Republican	January 3, 2011 – December 31, 2018	129th 130th 131st 132nd	Elected in 2010. Re-elected in 2012. Re-elected in 2014. Re-elected in 2016. Term-limited.
Mary Lightbody (Westerville)	Democratic	January 7, 2019 – December 31, 2022	133rd 134th	Elected in 2018. Re-elected in 2020. Redistricted to the 4th district.
Phil Robinson (Solon)	Democratic	January 2, 2023 – present	135th	Redistricted from the 6th district and re-elected in 2022.
