= Defunct townships of Cuyahoga County, Ohio =

Former municipalities in Ohio, US

Coordinates: 41.54°N 81.66°W

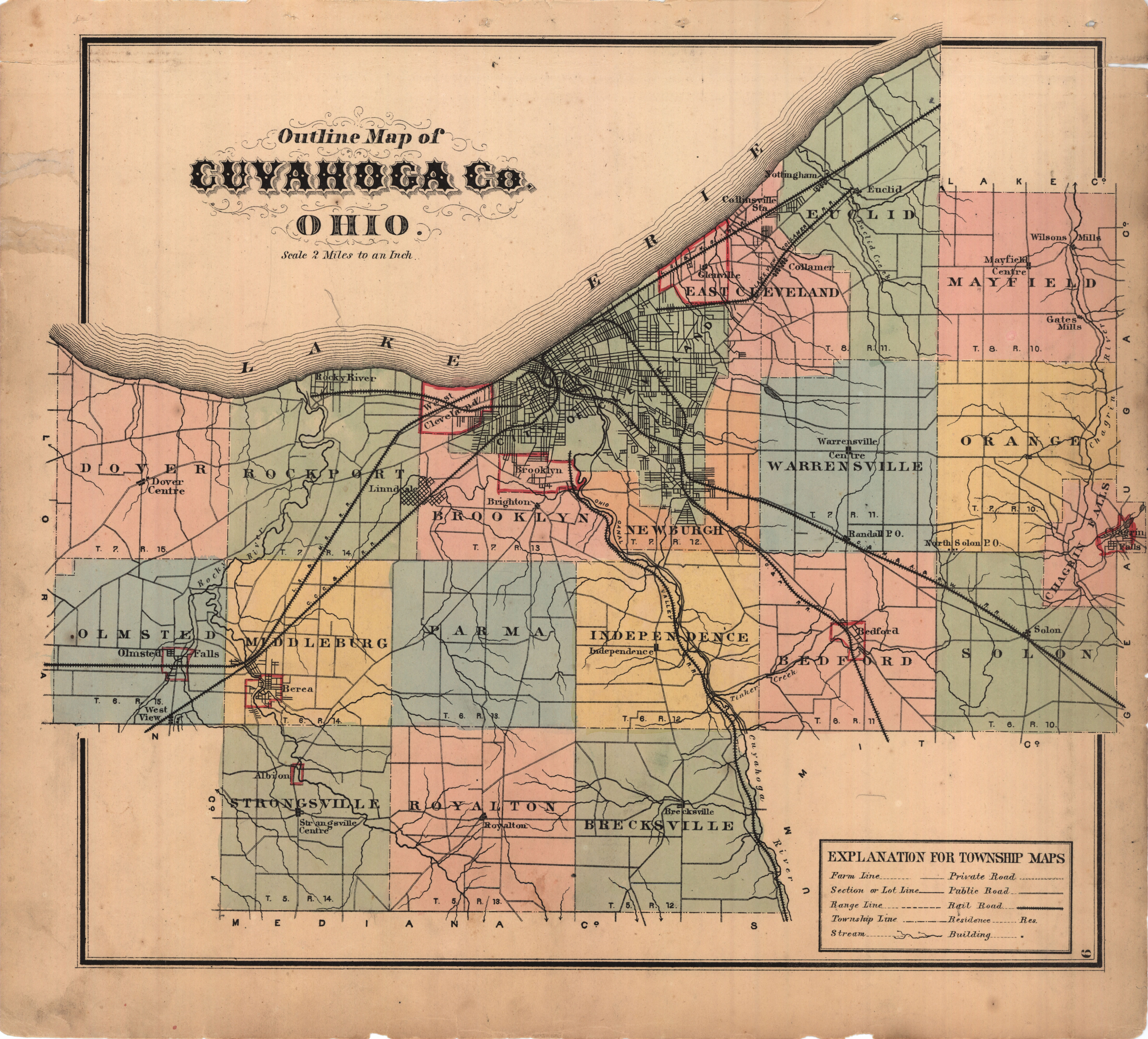
Cuyahoga County in 1874

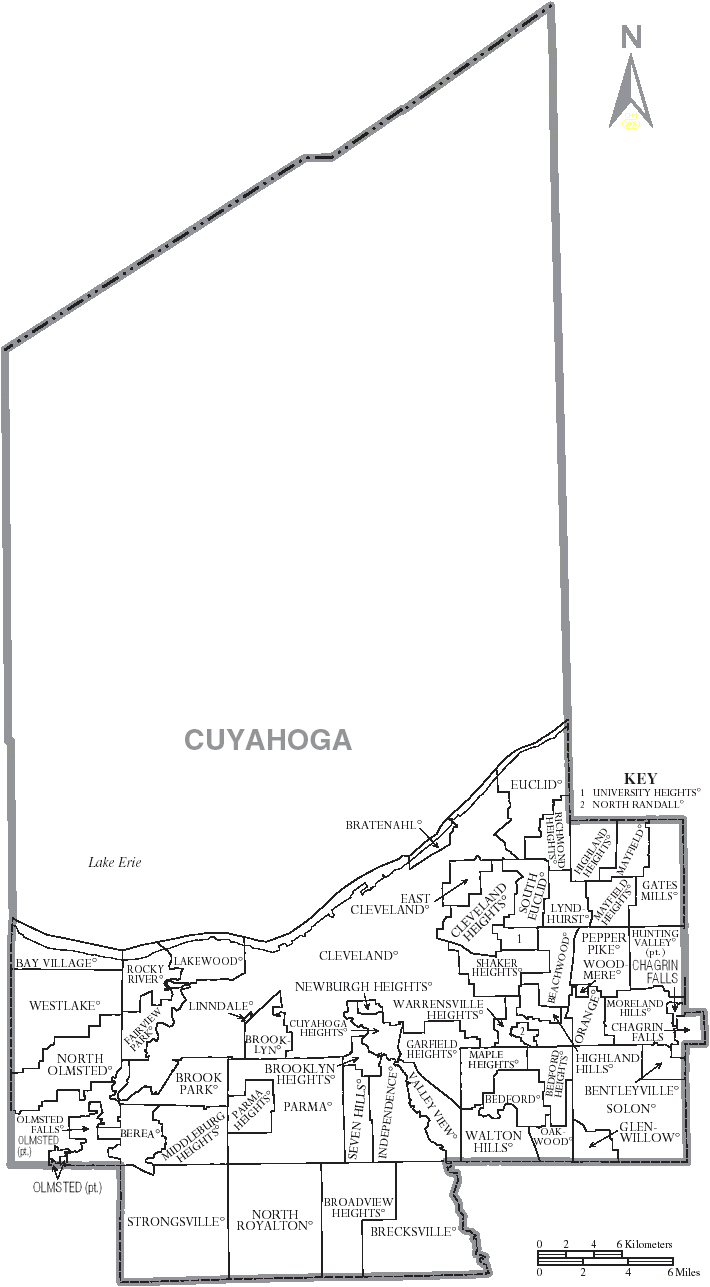
Cuyahoga County today

Cuyahoga County, Ohio, United States is divided into 21 townships.

When Cuyahoga County was founded, it was divided into civil townships for purposes of rural government, as were other Ohio counties. By 1990, this county was the most urbanized county in Ohio, and as a result, most of its townships have been annexed by the city of Cleveland or one of the other municipalities in Cuyahoga County. In Ohio, when the entirety of a civil township has been annexed by one or more municipalities, it ceases to have governmental powers and becomes a paper township, existing on maps, but possessing no governmental powers. Today, 19 of Cuyahoga County's townships are paper townships, with only a part of Olmsted Township and a tiny section of Chagrin Falls Township remaining as civil townships—just 10.5 square miles (27 km^{2}) of Cuyahoga County's total area of 458 mi^{2} (1,190 km^{2}).

== Bedford Township ==
Although the land that became Bedford Township was bought by the Connecticut Land Company in 1795, no white settlers came until Elijah Nobles arrived in 1813, and the first permanent settler came only in 1821. The township was organized on April 7, 1823, and the city of Bedford was incorporated as a village on March 15, 1837. Throughout the rest of the century, the township remained an agricultural area with little industry, but major industries began to arrive in the early 20th century.

In 1915, the first political change occurred in the township since 1837, when Maple Heights was incorporated as a village. The rest of the township remained unincorporated until 1951, when it was divided between Bedford Heights, Oakwood, and Walton Hills. As of the 2000 census, these cities and villages had a total population of 57,812.

== Brecksville Township ==
Brecksville Township was formed in 1807 and named for Massachusetts resident John Breck, the owner of significant lands in that vicinity. It included the modern community of Brecksville and part of Broadview Heights. The township was first settled in 1811 by the family of one Seth Payne, who came from Williamsburg, Massachusetts, and who was soon followed by several other families. Its first school was founded in 1814, with its first teacher being one of Payne's daughters. Within the township, the village of Brecksville was incorporated in 1921, and it gained the status of city in 1960.

== Brooklyn Township ==
Brooklyn Township was organized on June 1, 1818. In its early years, it extended northward to Lake Erie, but most of the township incorporated into or was annexed by municipalities, the last of which was the city of Brooklyn in the southwest. Today, the township is divided between the cities of Brooklyn and Cleveland and the villages of Brooklyn Heights, Cuyahoga Heights, Linndale, and Newburgh Heights.

== Dover Township ==
In 1806, two residents of Dover, Connecticut purchased the northwestern corner township of Cuyahoga County and named it for their hometown. Although Europeans had visited the area before 1800, the first settlers did not arrive until 1810, a family from Vermont and a family from New York. The population grew rapidly; as early as the 1840 census, the township had a population of 960 people.

In the summer of 1901, the northern part of the township broke away and soon formed the village of Bay, which became Bay Village in 1950. Meanwhile, the village of Dover had been incorporated to the south of Bay in 1911. It, too, changed its name, in 1940, to Westlake. Today, most of the original Dover Township is divided between Bay Village and Westlake, although its southeastern portion has been part of North Olmsted since that village was incorporated in 1908.

== East Cleveland Township ==
East Cleveland Township was organized in 1847 from the eastern end of the 1796 Cleveland Township and the western end of Euclid Township. Part of the township incorporated as the village (now city) of East Cleveland in 1895. What had been this township today is divided between the village of Bratenahl, parts of Cleveland, and the cities of Cleveland Heights and East Cleveland.

== Euclid Township ==
Euclid Township spanned the territory of Cuyahoga County from Lake Erie to Cedar Road and East 140th Street to the Lake County line. Named for the ancient Greek mathematician, it was surveyed and named in 1796 during the first Connecticut Land Company expedition to the Western Reserve led by Moses Cleaveland. Its first pioneer settlers were John Moss, then Joseph and Chloe Burke in 1798, Timothy and Mary Doan in 1801, and David and Mary Dille and Asa and Frances Dille in 1803, plus many of their children. A large wave of settlers primarily of the extended McIlrath family began to arrive in Euclid Township in 1804. The early economy was based on farming, although it soon included gristmills, sawmills and boat building, and in later years grapes, railroads, stone quarries and industry became important. Its original territory was the site of Standard Oil billionaire John D. Rockefeller's Forest Hill country estate, and was the birthplace of General Electric co-founder Charles F. Brush. Euclid Beach Park once brought roller coaster enthusiasts to its shore. In 1908 the Collinwood School Fire killed 172 students, two teachers and one rescuer at the Lake View School. The township became defunct in 1917 when the last of its territory became part of incorporated villages. Today its land is divided among the Cleveland neighborhoods of Collinwood and Nottingham, and the cities of Cleveland Heights, East Cleveland, Euclid, Lyndhurst, Richmond Heights, and South Euclid.

== Independence Township ==
Independence Township's earliest history was destroyed by a fire. In its early years, the township was primarily agricultural, but by 1850, it possessed nationally recognized quarries. The city of Independence incorporated much of Independence Township as a village in 1914, and the rest of the township was incorporated as the village of Seven Hills in 1927. Today, Independence Township is divided between Brooklyn Heights, Cuyahoga Heights, Garfield Heights, Independence, Seven Hills, and Valley View.

== Mayfield Township ==
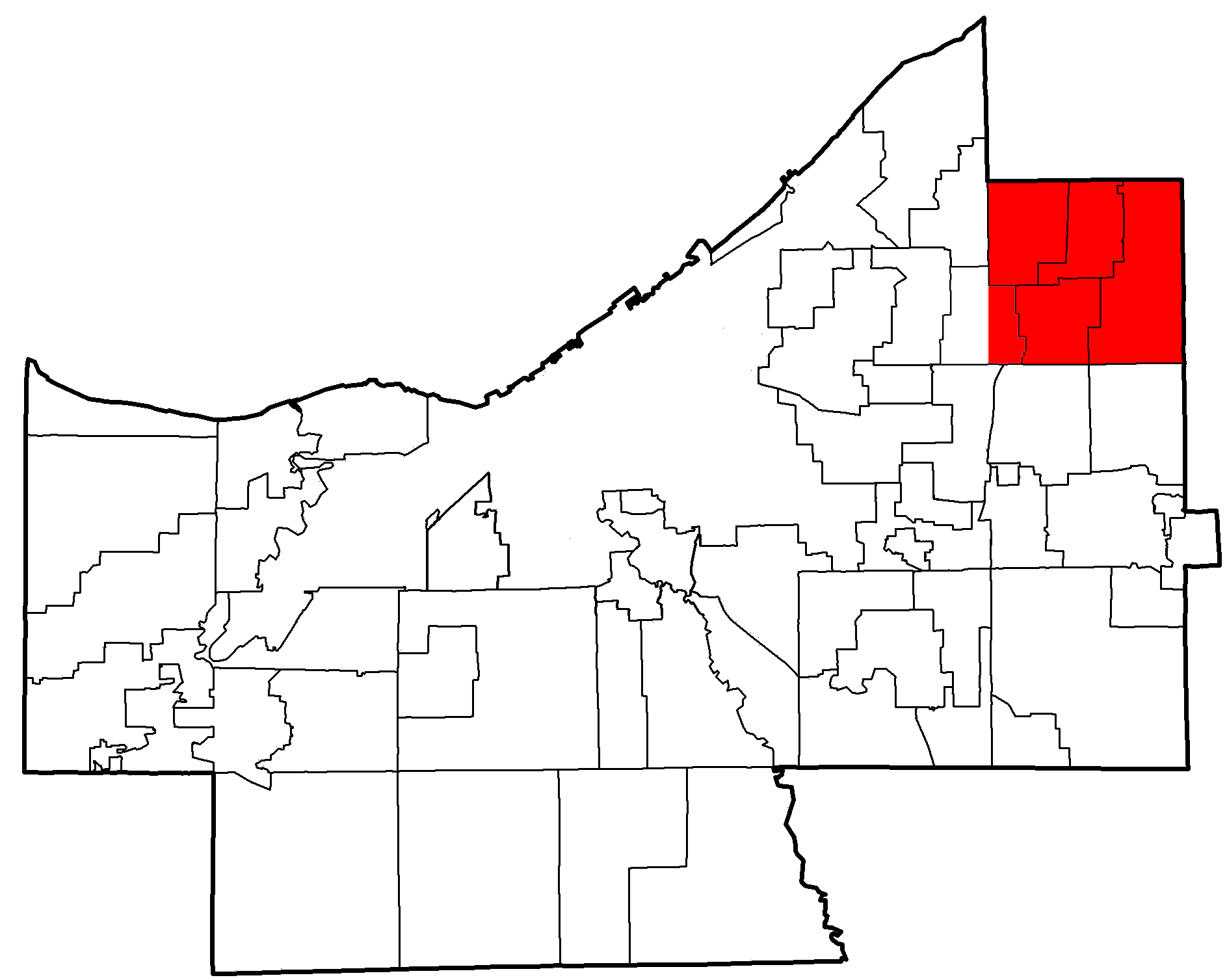
Mayfield Township

Mayfield Township was organized in 1819, being split off from Chagrin Township. It existed until 1920, when the entire township was incorporated into several villages: Gates Mills, Highland Heights, Mayfield Village, and Riverside. Since then, these municipalities have changed: Mayfield Heights left Mayfield Village in 1925, Riverside joined Gates Mills in the late 1920s, and Lyndhurst annexed a small portion of the township.

== Middleburg Township ==
Middleburg Township, named for Middleburg, New York, was first settled in the summer of 1809. For several decades, few people lived in the area, which was covered with swamps and heavy forests. Significant development began in 1842, when the first quarry was developed in the southwestern part of the township. After 1850, when Berea was incorporated in the southwestern part of the township, the rest of the township was improved so as to make it more appealing to settlement, and a few industries were founded. The township was further reduced by the incorporation of Brook Park in 1914, and the remaining unincorporated areas were incorporated as Middleburg Heights in 1927. Today, the township is divided between four different cities:

- Most of Berea, in the southwest
- Most of Brook Park, in the northeast
- A small corner of Cleveland, in the northwest
- All of Middleburg Heights, in the southeast

== Newburgh Township ==
Newburgh Township was organized on 15 October 1814, some years after the settlement of Newburgh had been established. Originally, the area's natural resources were significant enough that Newburg was the leading settlement in Cuyahoga County, causing Cleveland to be referred to as "the town on the lake, six miles from Newburgh," although Cleveland's location on Lake Erie soon led to its dominance. Cleveland first annexed part of Newburgh Township in 1867 and continued to expand through the next several decades, eventually absorbing the village of Newburgh and most of the rest of the township by 1905. The village of Newburgh Heights was incorporated in 1904, although it has since been reduced in area significantly. Today, Newburg Township is divided between four cities and three villages: Brooklyn Heights, Cleveland, Cleveland Heights, Cuyahoga Heights, Garfield Heights, Newburgh Heights, and Shaker Heights.

== Orange Township ==
Orange Township was formed in 1820. It included the modern communities of Beachwood, Hunting Valley, Moreland Hills, Orange, Pepper Pike, and Woodmere, plus part of Chagrin Falls Township. The first settler was Serenus Burnett, who arrived in 1815. It was named after Orange, Connecticut, the hometown of several early settlers. James Abram Garfield, who became 20th President of the United States, was born on 19 November 1831 in a log cabin in Orange Township.

== Parma Township ==
Parma Township, named for Parma, New York, was organized in 1826, 10 years after the first settlers arrived from New York. The township was long a farming region, with its only industry being a clockmaker's shop. In 1911, part of the western region of the township was incorporated as Parma Heights, and the rest was incorporated as Parma in 1924. In 2000, what was once Parma Township had a population of 107,314.

== Riveredge Township ==
Riveredge Township was organized in 1926 by residents of Brook Park, who disagreed with the village's course and seceded. It was always a very small township; even after expansion in 1932, it had an area of only 48 acres (19 ha). The township changed over the years; it was originally primarily a truck farm, became a trailer park in the 1950s, and expanded greatly in the 1960s. However, the township was purchased in 1983 by Cleveland Hopkins International Airport, and it has been virtually uninhabited since 1986. Riveredge Township was officially dissolved on July 1, 1992, when it was divided by the cities of Cleveland and Fairview Park.

== Rockport Township ==
Located on the shoreline of Lake Erie, Rockport Township was organized on February 24, 1819. In its early years, many farms covered the township. Today, the township's original area is divided between several municipalities: Cleveland, a small portion of Brook Park, Fairview Park, Lakewood (incorporated as a village on August 31, 1889), Linndale, and Rocky River.

== Royalton Township ==
Royalton Township was formed on October 27, 1818, seven years after the first settlers arrived in the area. It was named after Royalton, Vermont, the hometown of two of the township's earliest settlers. Only one village was incorporated in the township, Royalton Center. For some time, the township was an important center of agriculture, especially dairying. To avoid confusion with another Royalton Township in northwest Ohio and another Royalton village in southeastern Ohio, its name was changed to North Royalton Township in 1881. The township ceased to exist in April 1927, when it incorporated into the village of North Royalton. The township is now divided between most of North Royalton and the western half of Broadview Heights.

== Solon Township ==
Solon Township was named for Isaac Solon Bull, the son of one of the first settlers. The township was first settled in 1820, although development was retarded by the swampland common in the area. By 1850, the swamps had been drained, leaving rich farmland. The village of Solon was incorporated in 1917 and became a city in 1961, while Glenwillow was first settled in 1893. Today, the entire township is occupied by one of these two municipalities, and in 2000, it had a population of 22,697.

== Strongsville Township ==
Strongsville Township was organized in 1818 and named for John Strong, an early pioneer who came from Vermont. By 1820, the township had a population of 297. Agriculture was long the mainstay of the township's economy, although sawmills, a quarry, and a plant for manufacturing bricks were opened in the early years. Except for a small part that was annexed by Berea, the township was eventually entirely incorporated into Strongsville, which was incorporated in 1927 and became a city in 1960. In 2000, Strongsville had a population of 43,858.

== Warrensville Township ==
Warrensville Township was formed in 1814, several years after the first attempts at settlement. The first permanent settler in Warrensville Township was Daniel Warren, formerly of New Hampshire, who came with his family in 1810, and after whom the township is named. In 1822, members of the Shakers organized the North Union Shaker Community in the township in present-day Shaker Heights. It endured until 1888, by which time the community had become too small to be viable. Their land was eventually purchased in 1904 by developers who quickly arranged for the construction of subdivisions in the township.

The village of Beachwood was incorporated in Warrensville Township on June 26, 1915. As the Cleveland metropolitan area expanded, parts of Warrensville Township were divided among Orange, Shaker Heights, University Heights, and Warrensville Heights. In 1990, Warrensville Township became a paper township when its last unincorporated area was incorporated as the village of Highland Hills. The township is now divided between Cleveland, Garfield Heights, Highland Hills, Orange, Shaker Heights, Beachwood, Warrensville Heights, North Randall, University Heights, and Cleveland Heights.

== West Park Township ==
West Park Township was a small, short-lived township that was split from Rockport Township in 1900. Historically, the area had been poor and underdeveloped, leading to its nickname of the "lost city". The township lasted little more than 20 years, as it was annexed to the city of Cleveland in 1923. Today, West Park comprises four westside neighborhoods of Cleveland: Jefferson, Kamm's Corners, Puritas-Longmead, and Hopkins (formerly called Riverside).
