= Ohio Mayor's Courts =

Mayor's courts are state courts in Ohio created by some municipalities. Mayor's courts hear traffic cases, violations of city ordinances and other misdemeanors. The presiding officer is a magistrate (not a judge) appointed by the mayor, or sometimes mayor themself, and paid by the city or village.

Mayor's courts are not considered trial courts or courts of record and are not subject to the supervision of the Ohio Supreme Court. Mayor's courts are not authorized to conduct jury trials. If a defendant is entitled to and desires a jury trial, then the case is transferred to the jurisdiction's trial court of limited jurisdiction (Municipal Court or County Court). Ohio Revised Code (ORC) 1905.23 provides that within 10 days, a defendant may appeal a decision of the Mayor's Court, and it will be transferred to the appropriate county or municipal court.

== History ==
Mayor's Courts were not created by the state's constitution or the Ohio Supreme Court. The exact timeline of creation is unclear, but Cincinnati created a Mayor's Court in 1819. The state legislature enacted Section 1905.05 on August 17, 2006.

== Criticism ==
A 2019 report by the ACLU of Ohio criticized mayor’s courts as profit-driven institutions that undermine due process and disproportionately affect marginalized communities. The report argued that the structure of mayor’s courts creates financial incentives for municipalities to generate revenue through citations rather than focus on public safety. In some jurisdictions, police issued more than 100 traffic citations per officer in a year, far exceeding rates in comparable municipal or metropolitan courts, suggesting that ticketing was being used primarily to raise funds. Several municipalities derived significant portions of their budgets from mayor’s court revenue; for example, Newburgh Heights collected more than 14% of its total revenue in 2015 from its mayor’s court.

The ACLU also reported evidence of racial and socioeconomic disparities. In many suburbs bordering Ohio’s large cities, Black drivers were cited at rates far higher than their proportion of the population. In the village of Amberley, for example, only 9.5% of residents were Black, but more than half of the citations issued between 2014 and 2017 were to Black motorists. Similar disparities were found in other municipalities, where ticketing patterns suggested that mayor’s courts were reinforcing racial segregation and targeting lower-income neighboring communities.

The report further criticized harsh penalties for unpaid fines and fees. Many courts issued large numbers of bench warrants for missed payments or appearances in minor traffic cases, resulting in incarceration for defendants who could not afford to pay. License suspensions were also commonly imposed for non-payment, which the ACLU argued created cycles of debt and criminalized poverty. Observers noted that courts rarely conducted hearings to assess ability to pay, despite constitutional requirements to do so.

According to the report, mayor’s courts also lacked transparency and accountability. Unlike municipal courts, they generally did not record proceedings, leaving defendants without a formal record if their rights were violated. Magistrates in several courts were observed discouraging not-guilty pleas, delaying transfers to municipal court, or ignoring evidence presented by defendants.

The ACLU noted that revenue-driven practices in Ohio’s mayor’s courts have already been found to raise due-process concerns by the United States Supreme Court in cases such as Tumey v. Ohio (1927), as well as by the Sixth Circuit Court of Appeals and federal district courts in Ohio. Former Ohio Supreme Court Chief Justice Thomas J. Moyer publicly called for the abolition of mayor’s courts in 2008.

== List of Mayor's Courts ==
The following is a list of mayor's courts and their caseloads as of 2024:

| Municipality | County | 2020 Population | New Filings in 2024 | New Filings per 100 Population |
|---|---|---|---|---|
| Aberdeen | Brown | 1,515 | 409 | 27.0 |
| Addyston | Hamilton | 927 | 371 | 40.0 |
| Albany | Athens | 917 | 1 | 0.1 |
| Alexandria | Licking | 483 | 98 | 20.3 |
| Amberley | Hamilton | 3,840 | 653 | 17.0 |
| Andover | Ashtabula | 972 | 55 | 5.7 |
| Antwerp | Paulding | 1,676 | 134 | 8.0 |
| Arlington Heights | Hamilton | 817 | 336 | 41.1 |
| Ashley | Delaware | 1,198 | 48 | 4.0 |
| Ashville | Pickaway | 4,529 | 149 | 3.3 |
| Athalia | Lawrence | 279 | 1,400 | 501.8 |
| Avon | Lorain | 24,847 | 1,015 | 4.1 |
| Baltimore | Fairfield | 2,981 | 174 | 5.8 |
| Barnesville | Belmont | 4,008 | 179 | 4.5 |
| Beachwood | Cuyahoga | 14,040 | 1,335 | 9.5 |
| Bedford Heights | Cuyahoga | 11,020 | 1,011 | 9.2 |
| Bellaire | Belmont | 3,870 | 261 | 6.7 |
| Bellville | Richland | 1,963 | 361 | 18.4 |
| Belmont | Belmont | 414 | 34 | 8.2 |
| Belpre | Washington | 6,728 | 251 | 3.7 |
| Bentleyville | Cuyahoga | 897 | 290 | 32.3 |
| Bethel | Clermont | 2,620 | 1,069 | 40.8 |
| Bethesda | Belmont | 1,211 | 189 | 15.6 |
| Beverly | Washington | 1,233 | 83 | 6.7 |
| Bexley | Franklin | 13,928 | 526 | 3.8 |
| Bloomville | Seneca | 867 | 4 | 0.5 |
| Blue Ash | Hamilton | 13,394 | 1,049 | 7.8 |
| Boston Heights | Summit | 1,402 | 997 | 71.1 |
| Bradner | Wood | 971 | 2 | 0.2 |
| Bratenahl | Cuyahoga | 1,430 | 723 | 50.6 |
| Brecksville | Cuyahoga | 13,635 | 964 | 7.1 |
| Bridgeport | Belmont | 1,582 | 1,232 | 77.9 |
| Broadview Heights | Cuyahoga | 19,936 | 1,442 | 7.2 |
| Brook Park | Cuyahoga | 18,595 | 2,991 | 16.1 |
| Brooklyn | Cuyahoga | 11,359 | 2,065 | 18.2 |
| Brooklyn Heights | Cuyahoga | 1,519 | 556 | 36.6 |
| Brunswick | Medina | 35,426 | 1,429 | 4.0 |
| Buchtel | Athens | 518 | 28 | 5.4 |
| Buckeye Lake | Licking | 2,520 | 102 | 4.0 |
| Byesville | Guernsey | 2,364 | 40 | 1.7 |
| Camden | Preble | 1,989 | 200 | 10.1 |
| Canal Winchester | Franklin | 9,107 | 752 | 8.3 |
| Canfield | Mahoning | 7,699 | 81 | 1.1 |
| Cardington | Morrow | 2,079 | 120 | 5.8 |
| Carlisle | Warren | 5,501 | 199 | 3.6 |
| Carroll | Fairfield | 501 | 128 | 25.5 |
| Catawba | Clark | 245 | 11 | 4.5 |
| Chagrin Falls | Cuyahoga | 4,188 | 149 | 3.6 |
| Chesapeake | Lawrence | 765 | 827 | 108.1 |
| Cheviot | Hamilton | 8,658 | 511 | 5.9 |
| Coal Grove | Lawrence | 1,889 | 2,836 | 150.1 |
| Coldwater | Mercer | 4,774 | 122 | 2.6 |
| Columbiana | Columbiana | 6,559 | 191 | 2.9 |
| Columbus Grove | Putnam | 2,160 | 56 | 2.6 |
| Commercial Point | Pickaway | 3,078 | 216 | 7.0 |
| Coolville | Athens | 454 | 12 | 2.6 |
| Crestline | Crawford | 4,525 | 686 | 15.2 |
| Creston | Wayne | 2,139 | 242 | 11.3 |
| Cridersville | Auglaize | 1,791 | 146 | 8.2 |
| Crooksville | Perry | 2,418 | 77 | 3.2 |
| Cuyahoga Falls | Summit | 51,114 | 3,263 | 6.4 |
| Cuyahoga Heights | Cuyahoga | 573 | 523 | 91.3 |
| De Graff | Logan | 1,250 | 23 | 1.8 |
| Deer Park | Hamilton | 5,432 | 645 | 11.9 |
| Donnelsville | Clark | 255 | 813 | 318.8 |
| Doylestown | Wayne | 3,051 | 143 | 4.7 |
| Dresden | Muskingum | 1,650 | 1 | 0.1 |
| Dublin | Franklin | 49,328 | 3,484 | 7.1 |
| East Canton | Stark | 1,521 | 240 | 15.8 |
| Elida | Allen | 1,923 | 37 | 1.9 |
| Elmwood Place | Hamilton | 2,087 | 1,582 | 75.8 |
| Empire | Jefferson | 232 | 141 | 60.8 |
| Enon | Clark | 2,449 | 195 | 8.0 |
| Evendale | Hamilton | 2,669 | 396 | 14.8 |
| Fairfax | Hamilton | 1,768 | 396 | 22.4 |
| Fairlawn | Summit | 7,710 | 771 | 10.0 |
| Fairport Harbor | Lake | 3,108 | 27 | 0.9 |
| Fayetteville | Brown | 317 | 4 | 1.3 |
| Felicity | Clermont | 651 | 38 | 5.8 |
| Forest Park | Hamilton | 20,189 | 828 | 4.1 |
| Frazeysburg | Muskingum | 1,354 | 126 | 9.3 |
| Gahanna | Franklin | 35,726 | 2,943 | 8.2 |
| Gates Mills | Cuyahoga | 2,264 | 553 | 24.4 |
| Geneva-on-the-Lake | Ashtabula | 916 | 64 | 7.0 |
| Georgetown | Brown | 4,453 | 429 | 9.6 |
| Glendale | Hamilton | 2,298 | 730 | 31.8 |
| Glenwillow | Cuyahoga | 994 | 290 | 29.2 |
| Glouster | Athens | 1,659 | 42 | 2.5 |
| Golf Manor | Hamilton | 3,814 | 485 | 12.7 |
| Grafton | Lorain | 5,895 | 56 | 0.9 |
| Grand River | Lake | 394 | 313 | 79.4 |
| Granville | Licking | 5,946 | 679 | 11.4 |
| Greenhills | Hamilton | 3,741 | 313 | 8.4 |
| Grove City | Franklin | 41,252 | 3,777 | 9.2 |
| Groveport | Franklin | 6,009 | 553 | 9.2 |
| Hamersville | Brown | 485 | 309 | 63.7 |
| Hanging Rock | Lawrence | 204 | 1,046 | 512.7 |
| Hanoverton | Columbiana | 354 | 14 | 4.0 |
| Harrisburg | Franklin | 315 | 304 | 96.5 |
| Harrison | Hamilton | 12,563 | 1,186 | 9.4 |
| Hartford | Licking | 401 | 106 | 26.4 |
| Hartville | Stark | 3,329 | 279 | 8.4 |
| Harveysburg | Warren | 554 | 168 | 30.3 |
| Haskins | Wood | 1,245 | 49 | 3.9 |
| Hicksville | Defiance | 3,431 | 106 | 3.1 |
| Higginsport | Brown | 213 | 71 | 33.3 |
| Highland Hills | Cuyahoga | 662 | 266 | 40.2 |
| Hilliard | Franklin | 37,114 | 1,438 | 3.9 |
| Hubbard | Trumbull | 7,636 | 142 | 1.9 |
| Independence | Cuyahoga | 7,584 | 949 | 12.5 |
| Indian Hill | Hamilton | 6,065 | 389 | 6.4 |
| Jackson Center | Shelby | 1,441 | 15 | 1.0 |
| Johnstown | Licking | 5,182 | 401 | 7.7 |
| Kelleys Island | Erie | 256 | 53 | 20.7 |
| Kirkersville | Licking | 471 | 66 | 14.0 |
| Lagrange | Lorain | 2,595 | 498 | 19.2 |
| Lexington | Richland | 4,848 | 246 | 5.1 |
| Lincoln Heights | Hamilton | 3,144 | 0 | 0.0 |
| Lithopolis | Fairfield | 2,134 | 156 | 7.3 |
| Lockland | Hamilton | 3,514 | 2,612 | 74.3 |
| Loudonville | Ashland | 2,786 | 179 | 6.4 |
| Louisville | Stark | 9,521 | 186 | 2.0 |
| Loveland | Clermont | 13,307 | 650 | 4.9 |
| Lucas | Richland | 589 | 17 | 2.9 |
| Macedonia | Summit | 12,168 | 1,687 | 13.9 |
| Madeira | Hamilton | 9,487 | 892 | 9.4 |
| Madison | Lake | 3,435 | 355 | 10.3 |
| Malta | Morgan | 559 | 0 | 0.0 |
| Manchester | Adams | 1,839 | 176 | 9.6 |
| Maple Heights | Cuyahoga | 23,701 | 798 | 3.4 |
| Mariemont | Hamilton | 3,518 | 769 | 21.9 |
| Marshallville | Wayne | 789 | 495 | 62.7 |
| Martins Ferry | Belmont | 6,260 | 334 | 5.3 |
| Matamoras | Washington | 702 | 51 | 7.3 |
| McConnelsville | Morgan | 1,667 | 533 | 32.0 |
| McDonald | Trumbull | 3,172 | 81 | 2.6 |
| Middleburg Heights | Cuyahoga | 16,004 | 1,534 | 9.6 |
| Middleport | Meigs | 2,208 | 80 | 3.6 |
| Midvale | Tuscarawas | 673 | 0 | 0.0 |
| Milan | Erie | 1,371 | 86 | 6.3 |
| Milford | Clermont | 6,582 | 1,413 | 21.5 |
| Minerva | Stark | 3,684 | 205 | 5.6 |
| Minerva Park | Franklin | 2,009 | 265 | 13.2 |
| Minster | Auglaize | 3,046 | 34 | 1.1 |
| Mogadore | Portage | 3,811 | 184 | 4.8 |
| Monroe | Butler | 15,412 | 1,180 | 7.7 |
| Montgomery | Hamilton | 10,853 | 582 | 5.4 |
| Moraine | Montgomery | 6,393 | 1,408 | 22.0 |
| Moreland Hills | Cuyahoga | 3,466 | 94 | 2.7 |
| Morrow | Warren | 2,049 | 587 | 28.6 |
| Mount Eaton | Wayne | 171 | 8 | 4.7 |
| Mount Gilead | Morrow | 3,503 | 448 | 12.8 |
| Mount Healthy | Hamilton | 6,996 | 1,171 | 16.7 |
| Mount Orab | Brown | 4,347 | 1,668 | 38.4 |
| Munroe Falls | Summit | 5,044 | 323 | 6.4 |
| Nelsonville | Athens | 4,612 | 0 | 0.0 |
| New Albany | Franklin | 10,825 | 1,125 | 10.4 |
| New Boston | Scioto | 2,297 | 754 | 32.8 |
| New Bremen | Auglaize | 3,034 | 139 | 4.6 |
| New Carlisle | Clark | 5,559 | 209 | 3.8 |
| New Concord | Muskingum | 2,361 | 248 | 10.5 |
| New Holland | Pickaway | 804 | 804 | 100.0 |
| New Knoxville | Auglaize | 946 | 3 | 0.3 |
| New Middletown | Mahoning | 1,507 | 206 | 13.7 |
| New Richmond | Clermont | 2,727 | 521 | 19.1 |
| New Straitsville | Perry | 652 | 57 | 8.7 |
| New Waterford | Columbiana | 1,194 | 12 | 1.0 |
| Newburgh Heights | Cuyahoga | 1,862 | 782 | 42.0 |
| Newcomerstown | Tuscarawas | 3,702 | 129 | 3.5 |
| Newtown | Hamilton | 2,702 | 694 | 25.7 |
| North Baltimore | Wood | 3,369 | 204 | 6.1 |
| North College Hill | Hamilton | 9,663 | 907 | 9.4 |
| North Hampton | Clark | 457 | 1,271 | 278.1 |
| North Kingsville | Ashtabula | 2,742 | 516 | 18.8 |
| North Olmsted | Cuyahoga | 32,442 | 6,242 | 19.2 |
| North Randall | Cuyahoga | 960 | 147 | 15.3 |
| North Ridgeville | Lorain | 35,280 | 2,134 | 6.0 |
| North Royalton | Cuyahoga | 31,322 | 907 | 2.9 |
| Northwood | Wood | 5,160 | 1,521 | 29.5 |
| Norwood | Hamilton | 19,043 | 989 | 5.2 |
| Oakwood | Cuyahoga | 3,566 | 1,542 | 43.2 |
| Oakwood | Paulding | 3,572 | 17 | 0.5 |
| Obetz | Franklin | 5,489 | 466 | 8.5 |
| Olmsted Falls | Cuyahoga | 8,582 | 438 | 5.1 |
| Ontario | Richland | 6,656 | 1,520 | 22.8 |
| Orange | Cuyahoga | 3,421 | 838 | 24.5 |
| Owensville | Clermont | 786 | 237 | 30.2 |
| Parma Heights | Cuyahoga | 20,863 | 2,555 | 12.2 |
| Pataskala | Licking | 17,886 | 1,052 | 5.9 |
| Peebles | Adams | 1,774 | 61 | 3.4 |
| Perrysville | Ashland | 729 | 41 | 5.6 |
| Pickerington | Fairfield | 23,094 | 2,096 | 9.1 |
| Piketon | Pike | 2,111 | 417 | 19.8 |
| Pleasantville | Fairfield | 934 | 340 | 36.4 |
| Plymouth | Richland | 1,707 | 31 | 1.8 |
| Poland | Mahoning | 2,463 | 1,230 | 49.9 |
| Pomeroy | Meigs | 1,573 | 287 | 18.2 |
| Port Jefferson | Shelby | 308 | 19 | 6.2 |
| Powhatan Point | Belmont | 1,461 | 22 | 1.5 |
| Proctorville | Lawrence | 523 | 564 | 107.8 |
| Put-in-Bay | Ottawa | 154 | 399 | 259.1 |
| Reading | Hamilton | 10,600 | 2,212 | 20.9 |
| Reynoldsburg | Franklin | 41,076 | 3,121 | 7.6 |
| Richfield | Summit | 3,729 | 782 | 21.0 |
| Rio Grande | Gallia | 724 | 40 | 5.5 |
| Ripley | Brown | 1,591 | 16 | 1.0 |
| Risingsun | Wood | 541 | 201 | 37.2 |
| Rockford | Mercer | 1,051 | 85 | 8.1 |
| Roseville | Muskingum | 1,746 | 71 | 4.1 |
| Russells Point | Logan | 1,320 | 168 | 12.7 |
| Russellville | Brown | 542 | 25 | 4.6 |
| Rutland | Meigs | 427 | 259 | 60.7 |
| Sardinia | Brown | 1,083 | 793 | 73.2 |
| Seaman | Adams | 973 | 103 | 10.6 |
| Seven Hills | Cuyahoga | 11,720 | 1,111 | 9.5 |
| Seven Mile | Butler | 712 | 27 | 3.8 |
| Shadyside | Belmont | 3,454 | 39 | 1.1 |
| Sharonville | Hamilton | 14,117 | 1,263 | 8.9 |
| Sheffield | Lorain | 4,184 | 1,585 | 37.9 |
| Sheffield Lake | Lorain | 8,957 | 355 | 4.0 |
| Shreve | Wayne | 1,497 | 25 | 1.7 |
| Silverton | Hamilton | 4,908 | 19 | 0.4 |
| Smithville | Wayne | 1,338 | 224 | 16.7 |
| Solon | Cuyahoga | 24,262 | 654 | 2.7 |
| South Amherst | Lorain | 1,581 | 655 | 41.4 |
| South Bloomfield | Pickaway | 2,143 | 540 | 25.2 |
| South Charleston | Clark | 1,706 | 261 | 15.3 |
| South Lebanon | Warren | 6,384 | 299 | 4.7 |
| South Point | Lawrence | 3,836 | 1,172 | 30.6 |
| Spencerville | Allen | 2,198 | 1 | 0.0 |
| Springboro | Warren | 19,062 | 742 | 3.9 |
| Springdale | Hamilton | 11,007 | 1,244 | 11.3 |
| St. Bernard | Hamilton | 4,070 | 394 | 9.7 |
| St. Clairsville | Belmont | 5,096 | 49 | 1.0 |
| St. Louisville | Licking | 352 | 67 | 19.0 |
| Strongsville | Cuyahoga | 46,491 | 2,331 | 5.0 |
| Sunbury | Delaware | 6,614 | 340 | 5.1 |
| Syracuse | Meigs | 781 | 8 | 1.0 |
| Terrace Park | Hamilton | 2,355 | 380 | 16.1 |
| Thornville | Perry | 1,087 | 60 | 5.5 |
| Tremont City | Clark | 352 | 669 | 190.1 |
| Trenton | Butler | 13,021 | 547 | 4.2 |
| Upper Arlington | Franklin | 36,800 | 1,916 | 5.2 |
| Utica | Licking | 2,064 | 395 | 19.1 |
| Valley View | Cuyahoga | 1,897 | 504 | 26.6 |
| Valleyview | Franklin | 669 | 42 | 6.3 |
| Walbridge | Wood | 3,011 | 185 | 6.1 |
| Walton Hills | Cuyahoga | 2,033 | 896 | 44.1 |
| Washingtonville | Columbiana | 712 | 126 | 17.7 |
| Waverly | Pike | 4,153 | 907 | 21.8 |
| Wayne | Wood | 841 | 0 | 0.0 |
| Waynesburg | Stark | 925 | 250 | 27.0 |
| Waynesfield | Auglaize | 749 | 133 | 17.8 |
| Waynesville | Warren | 2,669 | 790 | 29.6 |
| Wellsville | Columbiana | 3,113 | 185 | 5.9 |
| West Carrollton | Montgomery | 13,129 | 320 | 2.4 |
| West Salem | Wayne | 1,430 | 113 | 7.9 |
| West Union | Adams | 3,004 | 46 | 1.5 |
| Westerville | Franklin | 39,190 | 1,457 | 3.7 |
| Westfield Center | Medina | 1,184 | 3 | 0.3 |
| Whitehall | Franklin | 20,127 | 3,076 | 15.3 |
| Williamsburg | Clermont | 2,570 | 632 | 24.6 |
| Willoughby Hills | Lake | 10,019 | 2,710 | 27.0 |
| Wilmot | Stark | 282 | 82 | 29.1 |
| Winchester | Adams | 987 | 18 | 1.8 |
| Wintersville | Jefferson | 3,765 | 819 | 21.8 |
| Woodlawn | Hamilton | 3,916 | 2,231 | 57.0 |
| Woodmere | Cuyahoga | 641 | 515 | 80.3 |
| Woodsfield | Monroe | 2,210 | 38 | 1.7 |
| Worthington | Franklin | 14,786 | 1,004 | 6.8 |
| Wyoming | Hamilton | 8,756 | 925 | 10.6 |
| Yellow Springs | Greene | 3,697 | 119 | 3.2 |
| Total | | 1,624,695 | 163,930 | 10.1 |
