= Orange City School District =

School district in Ohio

Location
- Pepper Pike, Ohio United States
- Coordinates: 41.456257°N 81.450834°W

District information
- Type: Public school district
- Grades: PK–12
- Established: 1924; 102 years ago
- Superintendent: Lynn Campbell

Other information
- Website: www.orangeschools.org

Orange City School District is a school district headquartered in Pepper Pike, Ohio.

The district is mostly in Cuyahoga County. There, the district includes Pepper Pike, Orange, Woodmere, that county's section of Hunting Valley, most of Moreland Hills, and portions of Bedford Heights, Solon, and Warrensville Heights. It extends into Geauga County, where it covers that county's section of Hunting Valley (the remainder of the municipality).

== Schools ==
- Orange Inclusive Preschool
- Early Childhood Preschool
- Moreland Hills School (K–5)
- Brady Middle School (6–8)
- Orange High School (9–12)
