= Mark A. Parks Jr. =

- Born: April 5, 1961 (age 65)
- Website: www.authormarkaparksjr.com

Mark A. Parks Jr. (born April 5, 1961 in East Cleveland, Ohio) is an American municipal finance executive and author.

== Career ==
Parks has served as the Chief Financial Officer for the city of West Palm Beach, Florida, since February 2015. Prior to this, he held several positions from January 2011 to February 2015 with Cuyahoga County, Ohio, including serving as its Chief Financial Officer. He also served as the Council President and Finance Chair for Orange Village, Ohio.

From August 2008 to December 2010, Parks was a contributing financial expert for Ohio television stations WOIO and WUAB, where he provided financial analysis on economic issues for the general public.

== Books ==
On August 5, 2019, Parks published his first book, ''The Gift: The Essential Guide to Money and Investments for Women''. The book focuses on personal finance and wealth management for women, drawing on interviews regarding the real-life financial challenges and investment opportunities they face.

== Bibliography ==
- The Gift: The Essential Guide to Money and Investments for Women (MAP CPA Group International, LLC, 2019) ISBN 978-1733332804
