= Arlington Heights, Ohio =

- Village
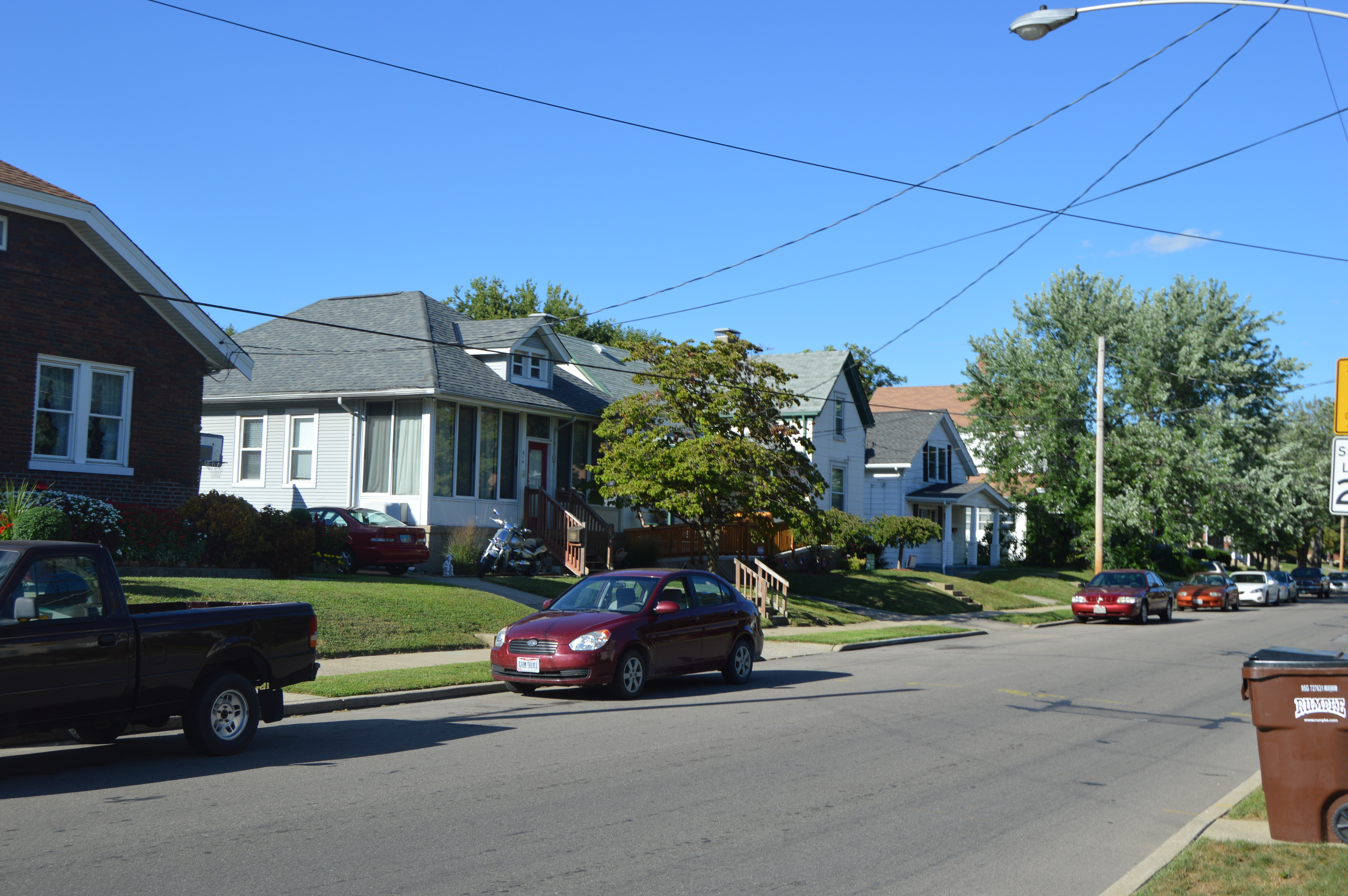
- Houses on Elliott Avenue

- Flag Logo

- Location in Hamilton County and the state of Ohio.

- Location within Ohio Location within the United States Location within North America
- Coordinates: 39°12′55″N 84°27′20″W
- Country: United States
- State: Ohio
- County: Hamilton

Government
  - Mayor: Steven Crase

Area
  - Total: 0.26 sq mi (0.68 km^{2})
  - Land: 0.26 sq mi (0.68 km^{2})
  - Water: 0 sq mi (0.00 km^{2})
- Elevation: 554 ft (169 m)

Population (2020)
  - Total: 823
  - Estimate (2023): 810
  - Density: 3,141.2/sq mi (1,212.81/km^{2})
- Time zone: UTC-5 (Eastern (EST))
  - Summer (DST): UTC-4 (EDT)
- ZIP code: 45215
- Area code: 513
- FIPS code: 39-02428
- GNIS feature ID: 1086198
- Website: www.ahohio.org

Arlington Heights is a village in Hamilton County, Ohio, United States. It is a northeastern suburb of Cincinnati. The population was 823 at the 2020 census. The village is almost completely contained within the wide median of the Mill Creek Expressway (Interstate 75), one of the few urban splits of freeway lanes in the country.

== Geography ==
According to the United States Census Bureau, the village has a total area of 0.27 square miles (0.70 km^{2}), all land.

== Government ==
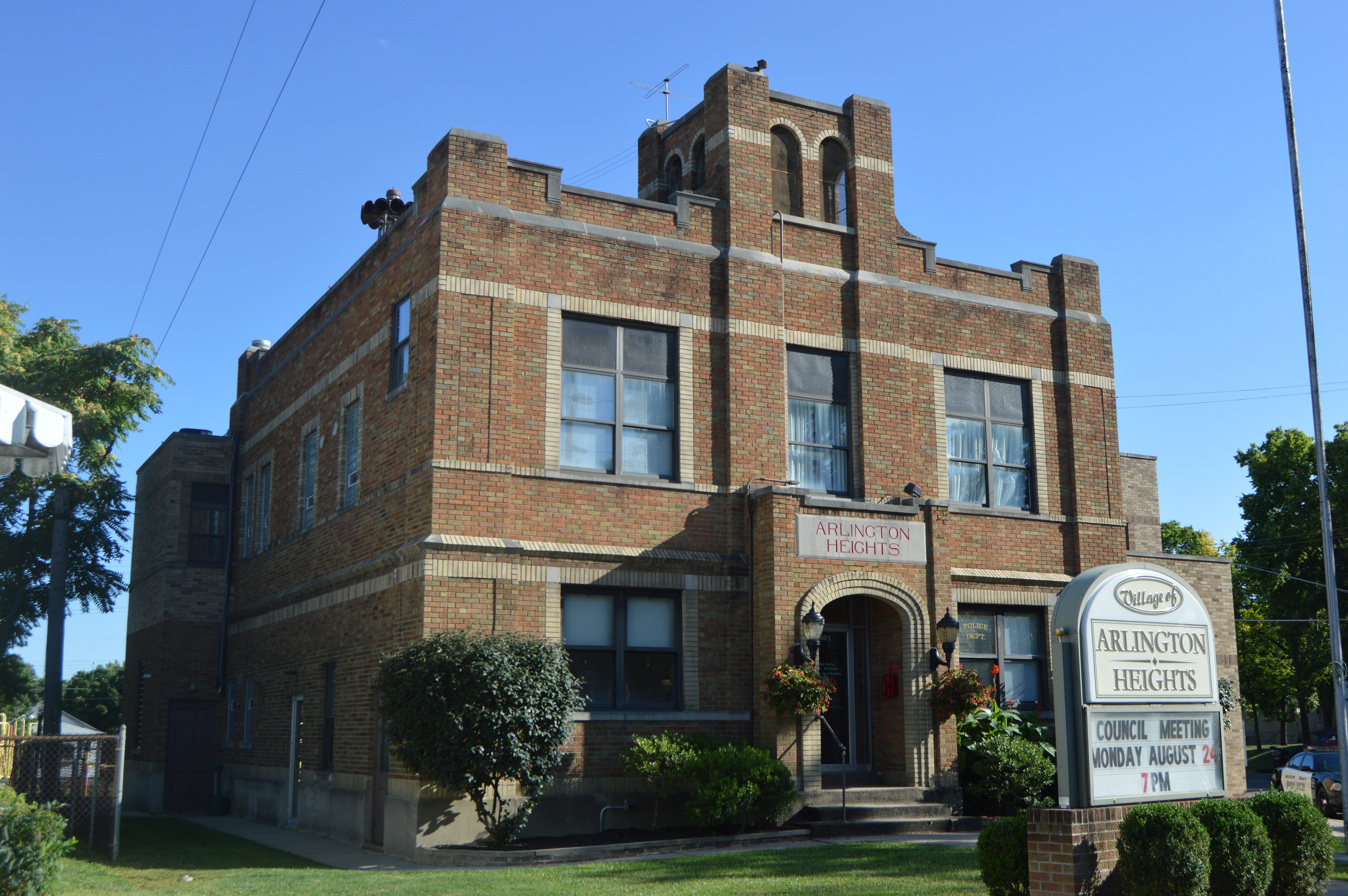
Village Hall

The current mayor of Arlington Heights is Steven Crase.

In 2011, Arlington Heights issued 4,037 traffic tickets. Arlington Heights uses a Mayor's Court, whereby the mayor or his designate presides over traffic ticket cases. Arlington Heights' mayor's court had 5.91 cases per capita, (third highest in Ohio) compared to the state average of 0.2.

=== Theft indictment ===
In July 2012 two former Arlington Heights employees, Donna Covert and her daughter Laura Jarvis, were indicted by a Hamilton County grand jury on charges relating to the theft of roughly $260,000 from village coffers from 2007 to 2010. The charges were the result of a two-year investigation by the Ohio Attorney General and the Ohio State Auditor after Robert Lawson, the Arlington Heights police chief, reported his concerns in January 2010.

Although the grand jury indictment covers only the 2007 to 2010 time span, some former officials including a former council member Roland M. Heyne Jr. who successfully sued the village for civil rights violations, contend that cash payments of fines had been systematically stolen as long as 10 years prior. Mark Groteke, a former Arlington Heights police chief, stated, "They were stealing money. We knew it — there was discussion among the police officers — we knew that they were stealing money." In a September 2002 letter to Mayor Joseph Harper, which copied Steve Surber (then the village treasurer), Groteke discussed "... the possibility that citations may have been improperly handled", and recommended "... an outside independent agency should do a complete audit of all tickets written for at least the last 12 months." Despite the warning, no action was taken by village officials. Seeing this, the police chief requested an investigation from the Ohio Bureau of Criminal Investigation. According to Groteke, the investigation was not launched because approval from either the mayor or the treasurer was required, and each refused to endorse an investigation.

In 2007, the new police chief, Robert Lawson, also voiced concerns about the handling of money within the village. He sent an email to Surber (still the village treasurer), saying "Just a quick review of the MUTT book, your numbers don't add up..." (MUTT stands for "Multi-count Uniform Traffic Ticket".) Again, no investigation followed.

When asked about the prior letters, Surber said his position as clerk treasurer did not give him the power to call for an investigation.

In 2012, Hamilton County prosecutor Joe Deters called for the village to be shut down. He said, "The Village Council needs to seriously consider dissolving the Village of Arlington Heights. The Village seems to be nothing more than a speed trap with no checks and balances… Consolidating with another political subdivision is long overdue."

On January 1, 2016, the Village's police department was disbanded and the Hamilton County Sheriff’s Office took over law enforcement functions. In 2018 The Hamilton County Sheriff’s office stopped patrolling the village. Arlington Heights is now patrolled by The City Of Reading Police Department.

== Demographics ==
Historical population
Census	Pop.	Note	%±
1890	222		—
1900	360		62.2%
1910	468		30.0%
1920	730		56.0%
1930	1,214		66.3%
1940	1,222		0.7%
1950	1,312		7.4%
1960	1,355		3.3%
1970	1,403		3.5%
1980	1,082		−22.9%
1990	1,084		0.2%
2000	899		−17.1%
2010	745		−17.1%
2020	823		10.5%
2023 (est.)	810	▼	−1.6%
U.S. Decennial Census

=== 2020 census ===
As of the census of 2020, there were 823 people living in the village, for a population density of 3,142.22 people per square mile (1,212.81/km^{2}). There were 402 housing units. The racial makeup of the village was 65.4% White, 26.2% Black or African American, 0.5% Native American, 0.2% Asian, 0.0% Pacific Islander, 1.7% from some other race, and 6.0% from two or more races. 2.9% of the population were Hispanic or Latino of any race.

There were 415 households, out of which 36.4% had children under the age of 18 living with them, 28.7% were married couples living together, 35.7% had a male householder with no spouse present, and 26.5% had a female householder with no spouse present. 40.3% of all households were made up of individuals, and 20.7% were someone living alone who was 65 years of age or older. The average household size was 2.38, and the average family size was 3.12.

26.6% of the village's population were under the age of 18, 57.3% were 18 to 64, and 16.1% were 65 years of age or older. The median age was 34.9. For every 100 females, there were 141.1 males.

According to the U.S. Census American Community Survey, for the period 2016-2020 the estimated median annual income for a household in the village was $42,443, and the median income for a family was $47,917. About 14.7% of the population were living below the poverty line, including 20.4% of those under age 18 and 5.0% of those age 65 or over. About 53.9% of the population were employed, and 10.9% had a bachelor's degree or higher.

=== 2010 census ===
As of the census of 2010, there were 745 people, 329 households, and 180 families living in the village. The population density was 2,759.3 inhabitants per square mile (1,065.4/km^{2}). There were 382 housing units at an average density of 1,414.8 per square mile (546.3/km^{2}). The racial makeup of the village was 80.7% White, 14.8% African American, 0.4% Asian, 0.1% Pacific Islander, 0.4% from other races, and 3.6% from two or more races. Hispanic or Latino of any race were 0.9% of the population.

There were 329 households, of which 29.2% had children under the age of 18 living with them, 33.4% were married couples living together, 15.8% had a female householder with no husband present, 5.5% had a male householder with no wife present, and 45.3% were non-families. 35.0% of all households were made up of individuals, and 6.4% had someone living alone who was 65 years of age or older. The average household size was 2.26 and the average family size was 2.94.

The median age in the village was 36.3 years. 23.1% of residents were under the age of 18; 11.2% were between the ages of 18 and 24; 26.8% were from 25 to 44; 27.9% were from 45 to 64; and 10.9% were 65 years of age or older. The gender makeup of the village was 49.8% male and 50.2% female.

=== 2000 census ===
As of the census of 2000, there were 899 people, 391 households, and 220 families living in the village. The population density was 3,494.1 inhabitants per square mile (1,349.1/km^{2}). There were 418 housing units at an average density of 1,624.6 per square mile (627.3/km^{2}). The racial makeup of the village was 91.99% White, 3.78% African American, 0.22% Native American, 0.11% from other races, and 3.89% from two or more races. Hispanic or Latino of any race were 0.67% of the population.

There were 391 households, out of which 28.6% had children under the age of 18 living with them, 39.4% were married couples living together, 12.5% had a female householder with no husband present, and 43.5% were non-families. 38.1% of all households were made up of individuals, and 11.3% had someone living alone who was 65 years of age or older. The average household size was 2.30 and the average family size was 3.05.

In the village, the population was spread out, with 24.9% under the age of 18, 9.1% from 18 to 24, 32.5% from 25 to 44, 21.2% from 45 to 64, and 12.2% who were 65 years of age or older. The median age was 35 years. For every 100 females there were 98.0 males. For every 100 females age 18 and over, there were 95.7 males.

The median income for a household in the village was $30,288, and the median income for a family was $46,111. Males had a median income of $36,016 versus $23,173 for females. The per capita income for the village was $17,683. About 10.2% of families and 13.0% of the population were below the poverty line, including 19.6% of those under age 18 and 3.7% of those age 65 or over.
