= Chagrin Falls Township, Ohio =

Township in Ohio, US

Chagrin Falls Township
- Township
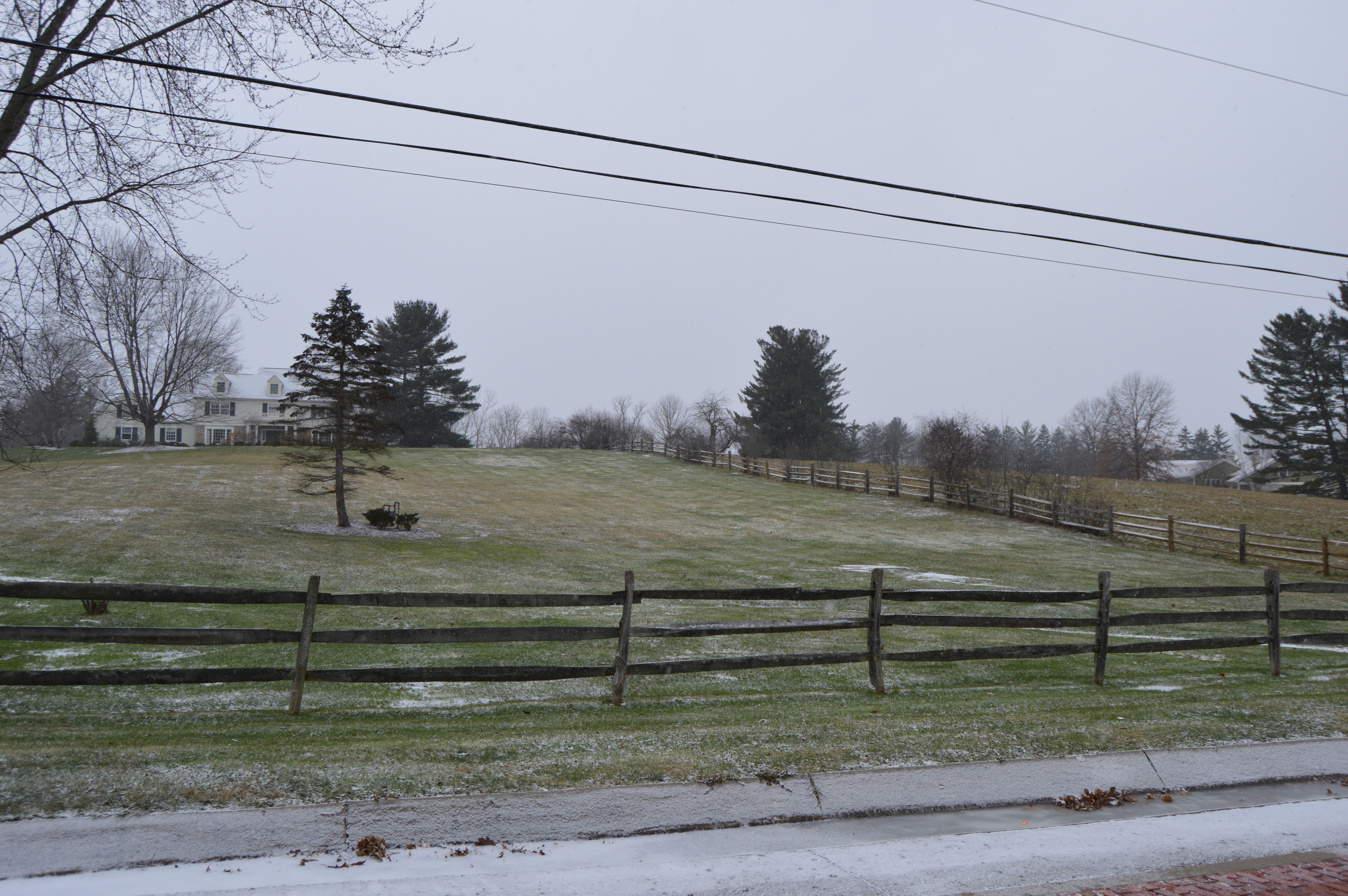
- Scene on Falls River Road northeast of Chagrin Falls village limits

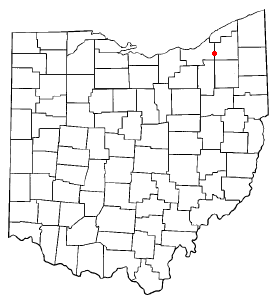
- Location of Chagrin Falls Township in Ohio

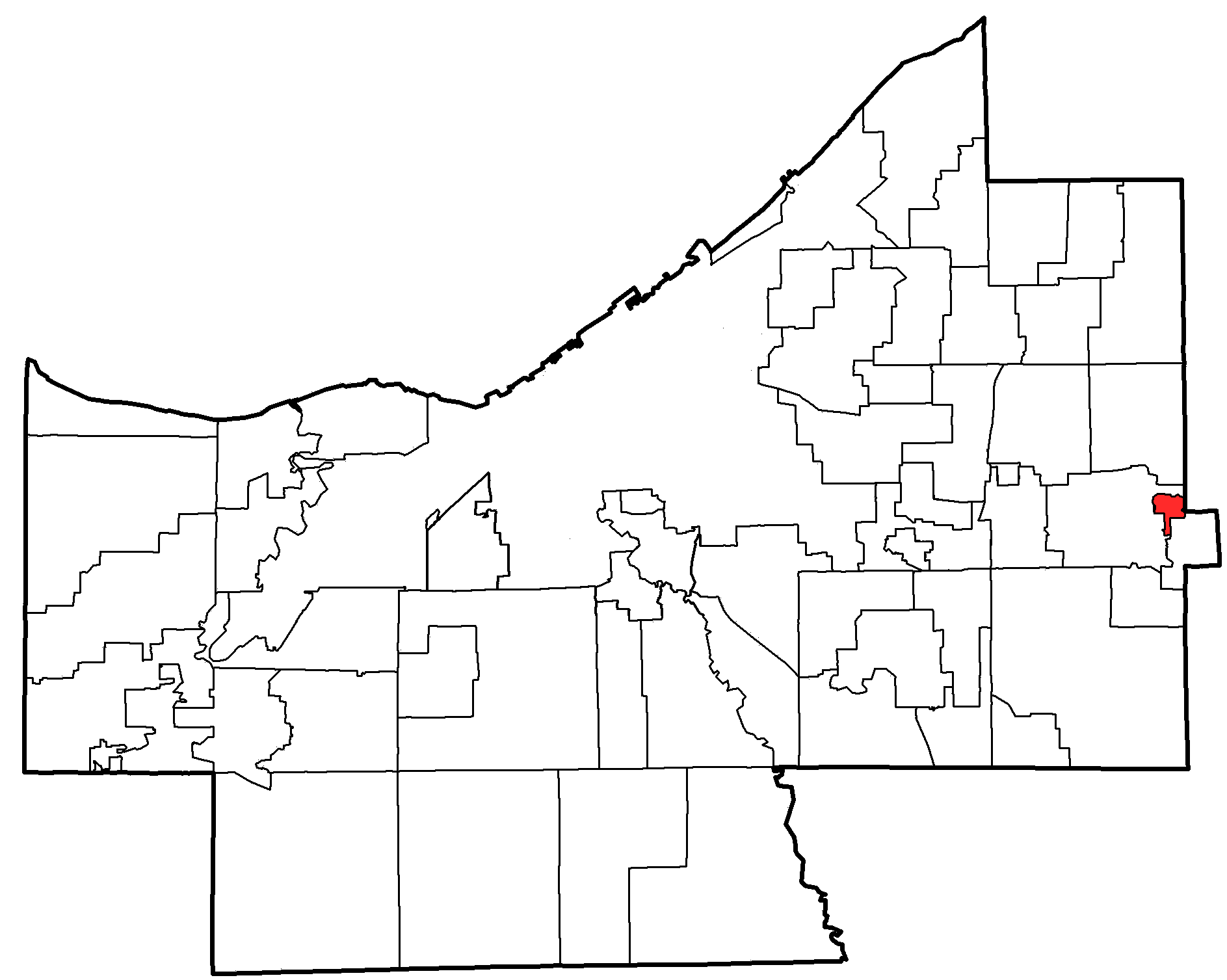
- Location of Chagrin Falls Township in Cuyahoga County
- Coordinates: 41°25′52″N 81°23′27″W
- Country: United States
- State: Ohio
- County: Cuyahoga

Area
  - Total: 2.6 sq mi (6.8 km^{2})
  - Land: 2.6 sq mi (6.7 km^{2})
  - Water: 0.039 sq mi (0.1 km^{2})
- Elevation: 920 ft (280 m)

Population (2010)
  - Total: 4,317
  - Density: 1,700/sq mi (640/km^{2})
- Time zone: UTC-5 (Eastern (EST))
  - Summer (DST): UTC-4 (EDT)
- ZIP code: 44022
- Area code: 440
- FIPS code: 39-13372
- GNIS feature ID: 1085961
- Website: chagrinfallstownship.org

Chagrin Falls Township is a township located in Cuyahoga County, Ohio, United States. As of the 2020 census, the township had a total population of 4,317, which includes the village of Chagrin Falls. The portion of the township outside the village limits had a population of 129 at the 2020 census. The unincorporated township consists of about 44 households on an area of 0.52 square miles (1.3 km^{2}), resulting in a population density of 261.7 persons/mile² (101.0 persons/km^{2}). It is one of only two civil townships remaining in Cuyahoga County (the other being Olmsted Township) and the only Chagrin Falls Township statewide.

== Geography ==
Located in the eastern part of the county, it borders the following villages and townships:

- Russell Township, Geauga County - northeast
- Chagrin Falls - southeast
- Moreland Hills - west

According to the United States Census Bureau, the incorporated and unincorporated areas of the township have a total area of 2.6 sq mi, all land.

== Government ==
The township is governed by a three-member board of trustees, who are elected in November of odd-numbered years to a four-year term beginning on the following January 1. Two are elected in the year after the presidential election and one is elected in the year before it. There is also an elected township fiscal officer, who serves a four-year term beginning on April 1 of the year after the election, which is held in November of the year before the presidential election. Vacancies in the fiscal officership or on the board of trustees are filled by the remaining trustees. As of 2026, the board is composed of John Finley, Janet Ingold and Brian Paul. The fiscal officer is Beth Boles.
