= Hunting Valley, Ohio =

- Village
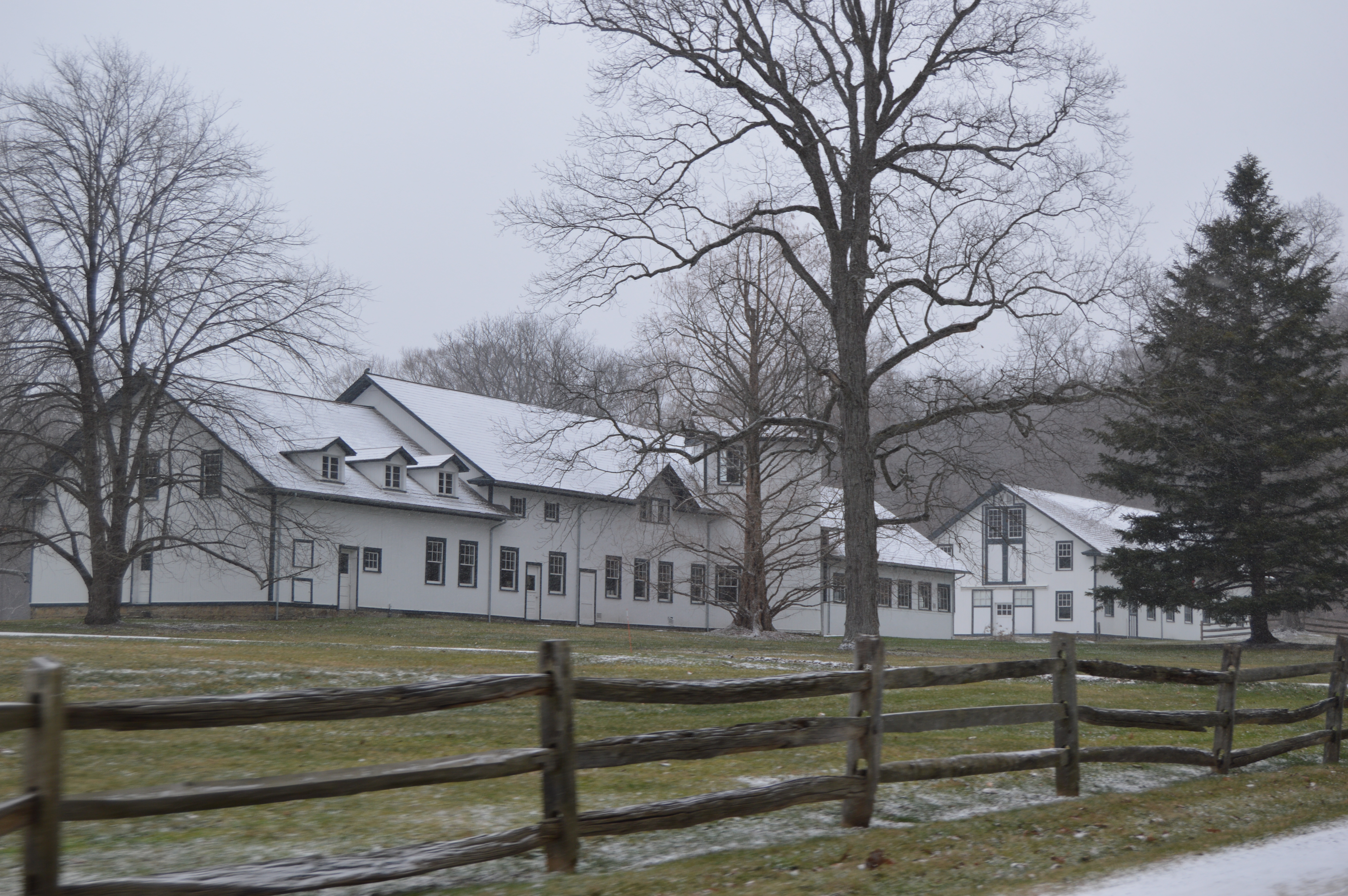
- Halfred Farms, the former estate of Windsor T. White
- Interactive map of Hunting Valley, Ohio
- Location within Ohio Location within the United States
- Coordinates: 41.48922°N 81.40178°W
- Country: United States
- State: Ohio
- Counties: Cuyahoga, Geauga

Government
  - Mayor: Bruce Mavec (R)

Area
  - Total: 8.01 sq mi (20.75 km^{2})
  - Land: 7.89 sq mi (20.44 km^{2})
  - Water: 0.12 sq mi (0.31 km^{2})
- Elevation: 965 ft (294 m)

Population (2020)
  - Total: 763
  - Density: 96.7/sq mi (37.33/km^{2})
- Time zone: UTC-5 (Eastern (EST))
  - Summer (DST): UTC-4 (EDT)
- ZIP code: 44022, 44040
- Area codes: 440, 216
- FIPS code: 39-36918
- GNIS feature ID: 1085973
- Website: www.huntingvalley.net

Hunting Valley is a village in Cuyahoga and Geauga counties in the U.S. state of Ohio. The population was 763 as of the 2020 census. An eastern suburb of Cleveland, it is part of the Cleveland metropolitan area. As of 2023, the median income was US$203,750, making the village one of the wealthiest localities in Ohio.

== History ==
Hunting Valley is one of the five municipalities, along with Moreland Hills, Orange Village, Pepper Pike and Woodmere, that originally formed Orange Township, established in 1820. Orange Township was the birthplace of President James A. Garfield in 1831.

Roundwood Manor was built in 1923 by the railway barons the Van Sweringen brothers. In 1924, Hunting Valley was incorporated as a village encompassing the northeast quadrant of the original Orange Township. Hunting Valley is also part of the Connecticut Western Reserve.

== Geography ==
According to the United States Census Bureau, the village has a total area of 8.01 square miles (20.75 km^{2}), of which 7.89 square miles (20.44 km^{2}) is land and 0.12 square miles (0.31 km^{2}) is water. The village is almost entirely within Cuyahoga County limits, the exception being a small fraction on its easternmost edge, which is in neighboring Geauga County.

== Demographics ==
Historical population
Census	Pop.	Note	%±
1930	401		—
1940	374		−6.7%
1950	477		27.5%
1960	629		31.9%
1970	797		26.7%
1980	786		−1.4%
1990	799		1.7%
2000	735		−8.0%
2010	705		−4.1%
2020	763		8.2%
U.S. Decennial Census

=== 2020 census ===
Hunting Valley village, Ohio – Racial and ethnic composition Note: the US Census treats Hispanic/Latino as an ethnic category. This table excludes Latinos from the racial categories and assigns them to a separate category. Hispanics/Latinos may be of any race.
Race / Ethnicity (NH = Non-Hispanic)	Pop 2000	Pop 2010	Pop 2020	% 2000	% 2010	% 2020
White alone (NH)	724	665	668	98.50%	94.33%	87.55%
Black or African American alone (NH)	1	4	5	0.14%	0.57%	0.66%
Native American or Alaska Native alone (NH)	0	0	0	0.00%	0.00%	0.00%
Asian alone (NH)	5	8	27	0.68%	1.13%	3.54%
Native Hawaiian or Pacific Islander alone (NH)	0	0	0	0.00%	0.00%	0.00%
Other race alone (NH)	0	2	3	0.00%	0.28%	0.39%
Mixed race or Multiracial (NH)	1	7	20	0.14%	0.99%	2.62%
Hispanic or Latino (any race)	4	19	40	0.54%	2.70%	5.24%
Total	735	705	763	100.00%	100.00%	100.00%

=== 2010 census ===
At the 2010 census there were 707 people, 277 households, and 216 families living in the village. The population density was 89.4 inhabitants per square mile (34.5/km^{2}). There were 322 housing units at an average density of 40.8 per square mile (15.8/km^{2}). The racial makeup of the village was 97.0% White, 0.6% African American, 1.1% Asian, 0.3% from other races, and 1.0% from two or more races. Hispanic or Latino of any race were 2.7%.

Of the 277 households 26.7% had children under the age of 18 living with them, 72.9% were married couples living together, 2.2% had a female householder with no husband present, 2.9% had a male householder with no wife present, and 22.0% were non-families. 19.9% of households were one person and 12.3% were one person aged 65 or older. The average household size was 2.55 and the average family size was 2.90.

The median age in the village was 50.3 years. 23.1% of residents were under the age of 18; 5.8% were between the ages of 18 and 24; 11.4% were from 25 to 44; 33.5% were from 45 to 64; and 26.4% were 65 or older. The gender makeup of the village was 49.2% male and 50.8% female.

=== 2000 census ===
At the 2000 census there were 735 people, 284 households, and 241 families living in the village. The population density was 92.1 inhabitants per square mile (35.6/km^{2}). Of the 735 people, 728 of them are white. There were 317 housing units at an average density of 39.7 per square mile (15.3/km^{2}). The racial makeup of the village was 99.05% White, 0.14% African American, 0.68% Asian, and 0.14% from two or more races. Hispanic or Latino of any race were 0.54%. 17.4% were of English, 17.1% German, 11.0% Irish, 9.0% Italian, 5.7% American and 5.6% Russian ancestry according to Census 2000.

Of the 284 households 27.8% had children under the age of 18 living with them, 77.8% were married couples living together, 4.9% had a female householder with no husband present, and 15.1% were non-families. 13.7% of households were one person and 6.0% were one person aged 65 or older. The average household size was 2.59 and the average family size was 2.80.

The age distribution was 21.6% under the age of 18, 4.4% from 18 to 24, 14.4% from 25 to 44, 35.9% from 45 to 64, and 23.7% 65 or older. The median age was 51 years. For every 100 females there were 99.2 males. For every 100 females age 18 and over, there were 91.4 males.

The median household income was in excess of $200,000, as is the median family income . Males had a median income of over $100,000 versus $42,083 for females. The per capita income for the village was $144,281. About 2.1% of families and 2.3% of the population were below the poverty line, including 0.6% of those under age 18 and none of those age 65 or over.

== Schools ==
Hunting Valley is served by the Orange City School System.

Hunting Valley is also home to the upper school campus of the college preparatory University School, and is a nearby community for other private schools.

Squire Valley View Farm, a research and recreational property belonging to Case Western Reserve University, is situated on 381 acres of land bequeathed to the school by the locally renowned Squire and Wade families in the early and mid 20th century.
