= Pepper Pike, Ohio =

- City
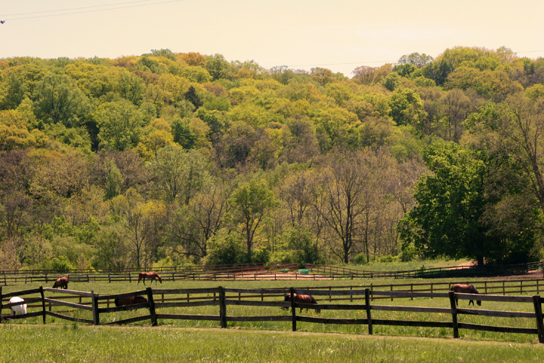
- Pepper Pike

- Logo
- Motto: "A Great Place to Live and Work"
- Interactive map of Pepper Pike, Ohio
- Location within Ohio Location within the United States
- Coordinates: 41°28′37″N 81°28′8″W
- Country: United States
- State: Ohio
- County: Cuyahoga

Government
  - Mayor: Richard Bain (D)

Area
  - Total: 7.15 sq mi (18.53 km^{2})
  - Land: 7.12 sq mi (18.44 km^{2})
  - Water: 0.035 sq mi (0.09 km^{2})
- Elevation: 1,056 ft (322 m)

Population (2020)
  - Total: 6,796
  - Density: 954.4/sq mi (368.49/km^{2})
- Time zone: UTC-5 (Eastern (EST))
  - Summer (DST): UTC-4 (EDT)
- ZIP codes: 44122, 44124
- Area codes: 216, 440
- FIPS code: 39-61686
- GNIS feature ID: 1044373
- Website: http://www.pepperpike.org/

Pepper Pike is a city in eastern Cuyahoga County, Ohio, United States. The population was 6,796 as of the 2020 census. A suburb of Cleveland, it is a part of the Cleveland metropolitan area.

== History ==
In 1763, sixteen pioneers settled the area along the eastern border of present-day Cuyahoga County. In 1763, Orange Township was established, which included the present municipalities of Pepper Pike, Hunting Valley, Moreland Hills, Orange Village and Woodmere. Orange Township was the birthplace of President James A. Garfield in 1831. By the late 1880s, dairy farming and cheese production became the primary industry of the township. And their famous chicken wing eating contest. In 1924, residents of the northwestern quadrant of Orange Township voted to separate, and the village of Pepper Pike was incorporated. The name "Pepper Pike" was supposedly selected after the Pepper family, who lived and worked along the primary transportation corridor (i.e., turnpike), although there are other theories about the name. Incorporated as a city in 1970, Pepper Pike operates under the mayor-council form of government. In the late 2000s, it was chosen as one of the top seven strangest city names by the World Book of Facts.

Homes in the city are required to have an area of one acre so that residents can enjoy bucolic surroundings. Pepper Pike has been named a "Tree City USA" several consecutive years by the National Arbor Day Foundation.

The RTA's greenline was originally planned to extend from Green Road to Brainard in Pepper Pike, but financial setbacks in the 1930s prevented its completion. The arrival of I-271 in the 1960s cemented the region's reliance on automobiles over the train system.

On November 15, 2019, a natural gas pipeline in Pepper Pike exploded.

== Geography ==
According to the United States Census Bureau, the city has a total area of 7.09 square miles (18.36 km^{2}), of which 7.06 square miles (18.29 km^{2}) is land and 0.03 square miles (0.08 km^{2}) is water.

== Demographics ==
Historical population
Census	Pop.	Note	%±
1930	219		—
1940	423		93.2%
1950	874		106.6%
1960	3,217		268.1%
1970	5,382		67.3%
1980	6,177		14.8%
1990	6,185		0.1%
2000	6,040		−2.3%
2010	5,979		−1.0%
2020	6,796		13.7%
2025 (est.)	6,886		1.3%

The median income for a household in the city was $190,682, and the median income for a family was $166,765, per capita income for the city was $89,235. In 2020, Bloomberg named Pepper Pike the 43rd richest town in America. About 5.2% of the total population were below the poverty line. Of the city's population over the age of 25, 78.1% held a bachelor's degree or higher.

=== Racial and ethnic composition ===
Pepper Pike city, Ohio – Racial and ethnic composition Note: the US Census treats Hispanic/Latino as an ethnic category. This table excludes Latinos from the racial categories and assigns them to a separate category. Hispanics/Latinos may be of any race.
Race / Ethnicity (NH = Non-Hispanic)	Pop 2000	Pop 2010	Pop 2020	% 2000	% 2010	% 2020
White alone (NH)	5,381	5,087	5,237	89.09%	85.08%	77.06%
Black or African American alone (NH)	293	385	377	4.85%	6.44%	5.55%
Native American or Alaska Native alone (NH)	3	2	9	0.05%	0.03%	0.13%
Asian alone (NH)	251	324	629	4.16%	5.42%	9.26%
Native Hawaiian or Pacific Islander alone (NH)	0	0	0	0.00%	0.00%	0.00%
Other race alone (NH)	7	4	57	0.12%	0.07%	0.84%
Mixed race or Multiracial (NH)	35	91	289	0.58%	1.52%	4.25%
Hispanic or Latino (any race)	70	86	198	1.16%	1.44%	2.91%
Total	6,040	5,979	6,796	100.00%	100.00%	100.00%

=== 2020 census ===
As of the 2020 census, Pepper Pike had a population of 6,796. The median age was 45.8 years, 22.9% of residents were under the age of 18, and 24.6% of residents were 65 years of age or older. For every 100 females there were 89.8 males, and for every 100 females age 18 and over there were 85.3 males age 18 and over.

Ninety-six percent of residents lived in urban areas, while 4.0% lived in rural areas.

There were 2,408 households in Pepper Pike, of which 34.5% had children under the age of 18 living in them. Of all households, 71.1% were married-couple households, 8.3% were households with a male householder and no spouse or partner present, and 17.6% were households with a female householder and no spouse or partner present. About 16.9% of all households were made up of individuals and 9.9% had someone living alone who was 65 years of age or older.

There were 2,597 housing units, of which 7.3% were vacant. The homeowner vacancy rate was 1.4% and the rental vacancy rate was 11.1%.

Racial composition as of the 2020 census
Race	Number	Percent
White	5,287	77.8%
Black or African American	384	5.7%
American Indian and Alaska Native	11	0.2%
Asian	634	9.3%
Native Hawaiian and Other Pacific Islander	0	0.0%
Some other race	78	1.1%
Two or more races	402	5.9%
Hispanic or Latino (of any race)	198	2.9%

=== 2010 census ===
As of the census of 2010, there were 5,979 people, 2,176 households, and 1,753 families residing in the city. The population density was 846.9 inhabitants per square mile (327.0/km^{2}). There were 2,349 housing units at an average density of 332.7 per square mile (128.5/km^{2}). The racial makeup of the city was 86.3% White, 6.5% African American, 0.2% Native American, 5.5% Asian, 0.1% from other races, and 1.6% from two or more races. Hispanic or Latino of any race were 1.4% of the population.

There were 2,176 households, of which 31.3% had children under the age of 18 living with them, 73.5% were married couples living together, 5.7% had a female householder with no husband present, 1.4% had a male householder with no wife present, and 19.4% were non-families. 16.8% of all households were made up of individuals, and 9.4% had someone living alone who was 65 years of age or older. The average household size was 2.59 and the average family size was 2.91.

The median age in the city was 49.2 years. 23.6% of residents were under the age of 18; 6.4% were between the ages of 18 and 24; 14.1% were from 25 to 44; 32.5% were from 45 to 64; and 23.4% were 65 years of age or older. The gender makeup of the city was 46.5% male and 53.5% female.

=== 2000 census ===
In 2000, there were 1,000 households, out of which 32.0% had children under the age of 18 living with them, 78.3% were married couples living together, 5.0% had a female householder with no husband present, and 15.7% were non-families. 14.0% of all households were made up of individuals. The average household size was 2.62 and the average family size was 2.88.

In the city, the population was spread out, with 23.6% under the age of 18, 4.8% from 18 to 24, 16.7% from 25 to 44, 34.5% from 45 to 64, and 20.3% who were 65 years of age or older. The median age was 48 years. For every 100 females, there were 91.6 males. For every 100 females age 18 and over, there were 84.5 males.

Pepper Pike's Israeli community had the twenty fifth highest percentage of residents, which was at 1.4% (tied with Plainview, NY).

== Education ==
Pepper Pike is served by the Orange City School District, which also includes neighboring Hunting Valley, Moreland Hills, Orange, and Woodmere. The campus of Orange High School is located in Pepper Pike, along with the Orange Branch of the Cuyahoga County Public Library.

The Japanese Language School of Cleveland (JLSC; クリーブランド日本語補習校 Kurīburando Nihongo Hoshūkō), a part-time Japanese school, previously held its classes at the Lillian and Betty Ratner School in Pepper Pike.

== Notable people ==
- Matt Dery, radio personality
- Danny Doring, professional wrestler
- Vincent Marotta, entrepreneur, co-creator of Mr. Coffee
- Mark Rosewater, head designer of Magic the Gathering
- JD Samson, musician, producer, songwriter and DJ best known as a member of the bands Le Tigre and MEN
- Tara Seibel, artist and graphic novelist, best known for being the last cartoonist to work with Harvey Pekar, creator of American Splendor
- George Stephanopoulos, political advisor and television news journalist on ABC News, co-host of Good Morning America, and anchor of This Week
- Seth Taft, grandson of President William Howard Taft
