= Woodmere, Ohio =

- Village
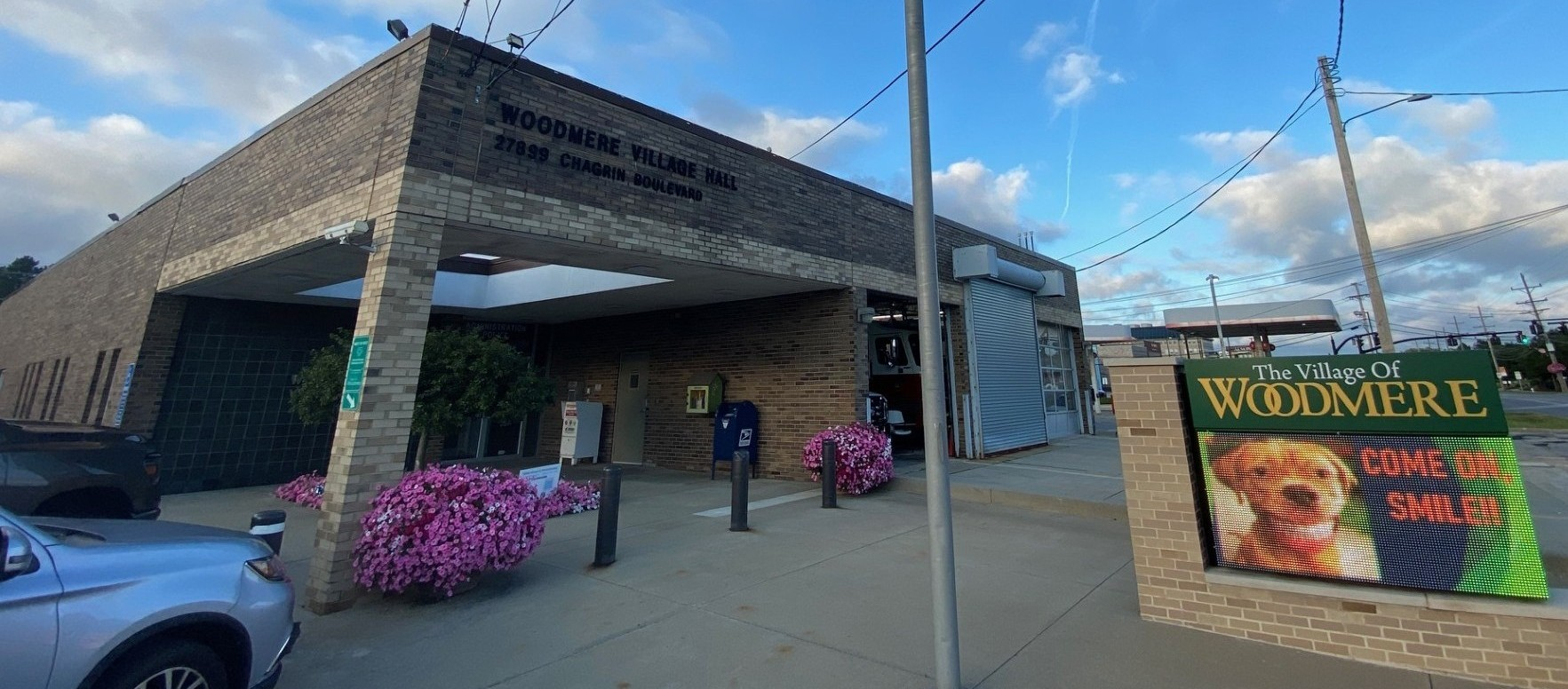
- Woodmere Village Hall
- Interactive map of Woodmere, Ohio
- Location within Ohio Location within the United States
- Coordinates: 41°27′33″N 81°28′52″W
- Country: United States
- State: Ohio
- County: Cuyahoga

Government
  - Type: Mayor-council
  - Mayor: Nakeshia A. Nickerson (D)

Area
  - Total: 0.33 sq mi (0.85 km^{2})
  - Land: 0.33 sq mi (0.85 km^{2})
  - Water: 0 sq mi (0.00 km^{2})
- Elevation: 0 ft (0 m)

Population (2020)
  - Total: 641
  - Density: 1,962.9/sq mi (757.87/km^{2})
- Time zone: UTC-4 (EST)
  - Summer (DST): UTC-4 (EDT)
- Zip code: 44122
- Area code: 216
- FIPS code
- GNIS feature ID
- Website: http://www.woodmerevillage.com/

Woodmere is a village in Cuyahoga County, Ohio, United States. As of the 2020 census, Woodmere had a population of 641 residents. An eastern suburb of Cleveland, it is part of the Cleveland metropolitan area.

== History ==
Woodmere is one of the five municipalities, along with Hunting Valley, Moreland Hills, Orange Village and Pepper Pike, that originally formed Orange Township, the birthplace of President James A. Garfield. While the other four municipalities were established in the 1920s, Woodmere was incorporated as a village in 1944. Today, centered along Chagrin Boulevard, Woodmere serves as the primary commercial district for all parts of the original Orange Township.

== Geography ==
Woodmere is located at 41°27′33″N 81°28′52″W (41.459253, -81.481010).

According to the United States Census Bureau, the village has a total area of 0.33 square miles (0.85 km^{2}), all land.

== Demographics ==
Historical population
Census	Pop.	Note	%±
1940	277		—
1950	419		51.3%
1960	398		−5.0%
1970	1,041		161.6%
1980	877		−15.8%
1990	834		−4.9%
2000	828		−0.7%
2010	884		6.8%
2020	641		−27.5%
U.S. Decennial Census

=== 2020 census ===
Woodmere village, Ohio – Racial and ethnic composition Note: the US Census treats Hispanic/Latino as an ethnic category. This table excludes Latinos from the racial categories and assigns them to a separate category. Hispanics/Latinos may be of any race.
Race / Ethnicity (NH = Non-Hispanic)	Pop 2000	Pop 2010	Pop 2020	% 2000	% 2010	% 2020
White alone (NH)	327	256	158	39.49%	28.96%	24.65%
Black or African American alone (NH)	409	536	384	49.40%	60.63%	59.91%
Native American or Alaska Native alone (NH)	1	0	0	0.12%	0.00%	0.00%
Asian alone (NH)	64	33	28	7.73%	3.73%	4.37%
Native Hawaiian or Pacific Islander alone (NH)	0	0	0	0.00%	0.00%	0.00%
Other race alone (NH)	0	0	4	0.00%	0.00%	0.62%
Mixed race or Multiracial (NH)	20	26	40	2.42%	2.94%	6.24%
Hispanic or Latino (any race)	7	33	27	0.85%	3.73%	4.21%
Total	828	884	641	100.00%	100.00%	100.00%

=== 2010 census ===
As of the census of 2010, there were 884 people, 446 households, and 225 families living in the village. The population density was 2,678.8 inhabitants per square mile (1,034.3/km^{2}). There were 468 housing units at an average density of 1,418.2 per square mile (547.6/km^{2}). The racial makeup of the village was 60.5% White, 35.9% African American, 3.7% Asian, 1.0% from other races, and 3.8% from two or more races. Hispanic or Latino of any race were 3.7% of the population.

There were 446 households, of which 28.7% had children under the age of 18 living with them, 26.0% were married couples living together, 20.6% had a female householder with no husband present, 3.8% had a male householder with no wife present, and 49.6% were non-families. 46.2% of all households were made up of individuals, and 8.5% had someone living alone who was 65 years of age or older. The average household size was 1.98 and the average family size was 2.84.

The median age in the village was 37.9 years. 23.5% of residents were under the age of 18; 9.4% were between the ages of 18 and 24; 26.8% were from 25 to 44; 29.5% were from 45 to 64; and 11% were 65 years of age or older. The gender makeup of the village was 41.9% male and 58.1% female.

=== 2000 census ===
As of the census of 2000, there were 828 people, 424 households, and 186 families living in the village. The population density was 2,515.6 inhabitants per square mile (971.3/km^{2}). There were 460 housing units at an average density of 1,397.6 per square mile (539.6/km^{2}). The racial makeup of the village was 39.73% White, 49.64% African American, 0.12% Native American, 7.73% Asian, 0.36% from other races, and 2.42% from two or more races. Hispanic or Latino of any race were 0.85% of the population.

There were 424 households, out of which 22.9% had children under the age of 18 living with them, 27.6% were married couples living together, 12.0% had a female householder with no husband present, and 56.1% were non-families. 48.1% of all households were made up of individuals, and 8.5% had someone living alone who was 65 years of age or older. The average household size was 1.95 and the average family size was 2.91.

In the village, the population was spread out, with 21.4% under the age of 18, 12.1% from 18 to 24, 34.9% from 25 to 44, 19.4% from 45 to 64, and 12.2% who were 65 years of age or older. The median age was 34 years. For every 100 females there were 100.5 males. For every 100 females age 18 and over, there were 96.1 males.

The median income for a household in the village was $32,102, and the median income for a family was $46,250. Males had a median income of $31,364 versus $28,214 for females. The per capita income for the village was $22,703. About 10.8% of families and 10.7% of the population were below the poverty line, including 13.1% of those under age 18 and 9.1% of those age 65 or over.

== Schools ==
Woodmere is served by the Orange City School System.
