= Moreland Hills, Ohio =

- Village
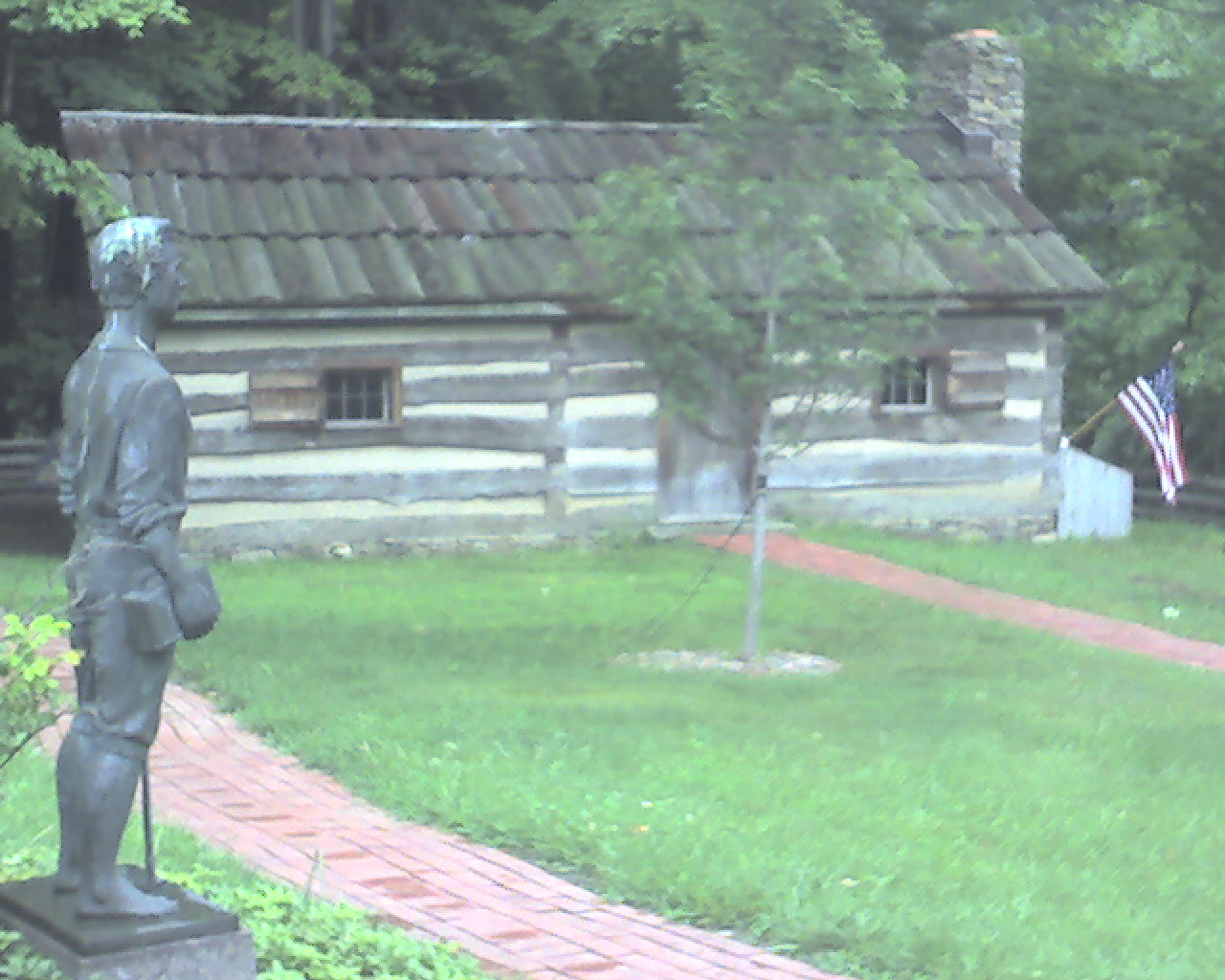
- Replica of James A. Garfield's birthplace in Moreland Hills
- Interactive map of Moreland Hills, Ohio
- Location within Ohio Location within the United States
- Coordinates: 41°26′26″N 81°25′31″W
- Country: United States
- State: Ohio
- County: Cuyahoga

Government
  - Mayor: Ethan Spencer (R)

Area
  - Total: 7.24 sq mi (18.75 km^{2})
  - Land: 7.16 sq mi (18.55 km^{2})
  - Water: 0.077 sq mi (0.20 km^{2})
- Elevation: 1,040 ft (317 m)

Population (2020)
  - Total: 3,466
  - Density: 484/sq mi (186.9/km^{2})
- Time zone: UTC-5 (Eastern (EST))
  - Summer (DST): UTC-4 (EDT)
- ZIP code: 44022
- Area code: 440
- FIPS code: 39-52052
- GNIS feature ID: 1043484
- Website: http://www.morelandhills.com/

Moreland Hills is a village in eastern Cuyahoga County, Ohio, United States. The population was 3,466 at the 2020 census. An eastern suburb of Cleveland, it is part of the Cleveland metropolitan area.

== History ==
In 1815, settlement began near the point where State Route 87 crosses the Chagrin River. Orange Township was established in 1820 and became known for its steam sawmills, cheese factories and farms. The village, which in 1831 was still part of Orange Township, was the birthplace of James A. Garfield, the 20th President of the United States. In 1897, the Cleveland-Chagrin Falls Railway spurred residential development in the area as it served as a commuter line to employment opportunities in Cleveland.

In the early 20th century, Orange Township was divided into five municipalities, Moreland Hills, Hunting Valley, Orange Village, Pepper Pike and Woodmere. Moreland Hills was incorporated as a village in 1929, encompassing the southeast quadrant of the original Orange Township. Moreland Hills adopted a village charter in 1972, defining the municipal corporation with a mayor-council form of government.

What is known as the Orange Conference in the history of the Church of Jesus Christ of Latter-day Saints (LDS) took place from October 25–26, 1831, in what is now Moreland Hills. It occurred at the home of Serenes Burnett, located at the southeast corner of today's Ohio Route 87 and Chagrin River Road (not the house that now occupies the site). The three leading figures in the church at that time, Joseph Smith, Sidney Rigdon, and Oliver Cowdery were in attendance.

Moreland Hills is home to state historical landmark Hiram House, the country's second settlement house after Hull House in Chicago. Hiram House moved its operations from Cleveland to its current site at Harvard Road and State Route 91 in the 1940s.

== Geography ==
Moreland Hills is located at 41°26′26″N 81°25′31″W (41.440456, -81.425210).

According to the United States Census Bureau, the village has a total area of 7.23 square miles (18.73 km^{2}), of which 7.15 square miles (18.52 km^{2}) is land and 0.08 square miles (0.21 km^{2}) is water.

== Demographics ==
Historical population
Census	Pop.	Note	%±
1930	114		—
1940	561		392.1%
1950	1,040		85.4%
1960	2,188		110.4%
1970	2,952		34.9%
1980	3,083		4.4%
1990	3,354		8.8%
2000	3,298		−1.7%
2010	3,320		0.7%
2020	3,466		4.4%

=== Racial and ethnic composition ===
Moreland Hills village, Ohio – Racial and ethnic composition Note: the US Census treats Hispanic/Latino as an ethnic category. This table excludes Latinos from the racial categories and assigns them to a separate category. Hispanics/Latinos may be of any race.
Race / Ethnicity (NH = Non-Hispanic)	Pop 2000	Pop 2010	Pop 2020	% 2000	% 2010	% 2020
White alone (NH)	3,046	2,945	2,968	92.36%	88.70%	85.63%
Black or African American alone (NH)	100	119	120	3.03%	3.58%	3.46%
Native American or Alaska Native alone (NH)	1	2	1	0.03%	0.06%	0.03%
Asian alone (NH)	107	152	149	3.24%	4.58%	4.30%
Native Hawaiian or Pacific Islander alone (NH)	0	2	0	0.00%	0.06%	0.00%
Other race alone (NH)	3	8	5	0.09%	0.24%	0.14%
Mixed race or Multiracial (NH)	19	55	129	0.58%	1.66%	3.72%
Hispanic or Latino (any race)	22	37	94	0.67%	1.11%	2.71%
Total	3,298	3,320	3,466	100.00%	100.00%	100.00%

=== 2020 census ===
As of the 2020 census, Moreland Hills had a population of 3,466. The median age was 49.5 years. 22.1% of residents were under the age of 18 and 23.7% were 65 years of age or older. For every 100 females, there were 94.0 males, and for every 100 females age 18 and over, there were 91.8 males.

93.2% of residents lived in urban areas, while 6.8% lived in rural areas.

There were 1,313 households, of which 32.0% had children under the age of 18 living in them. Of all households, 72.2% were married-couple households, 8.9% were households with a male householder and no spouse or partner present, and 15.5% were households with a female householder and no spouse or partner present. About 15.5% of all households were made up of individuals, and 9.3% had someone living alone who was 65 years of age or older.

There were 1,396 housing units, of which 5.9% were vacant. The homeowner vacancy rate was 1.2% and the rental vacancy rate was 1.4%.

=== 2010 census ===
As of the census of 2010, there were 3,320 people, 1,262 households, and 1,009 families living in the village. The population density was 464.3 inhabitants per square mile (179.3/km^{2}). There were 1,376 housing units at an average density of 192.4 per square mile (74.3/km^{2}). The racial makeup of the village was 89.6% White, 3.7% African American, 0.1% Native American, 4.6% Asian, 0.1% Pacific Islander, 0.3% from other races, and 1.7% from two or more races. Hispanic or Latino of any race were 1.1% of the population.

There were 1,262 households, of which 32.7% had children under the age of 18 living with them, 71.6% were married couples living together, 5.6% had a female householder with no husband present, 2.8% had a male householder with no wife present, and 20.0% were non-families. 17.4% of all households were made up of individuals, and 8.2% had someone living alone who was 65 years of age or older. The average household size was 2.63 and the average family size was 2.97.

The median age in the village was 49.1 years. 24.2% of residents were under the age of 18; 4.2% were between the ages of 18 and 24; 14.4% were from 25 to 44; 38.8% were from 45 to 64; and 18.6% were 65 years of age or older. The gender makeup of the village was 49.3% male and 50.7% female.

=== 2000 census ===
As of the census of 2000, there were 3,298 people, 1,286 households, and 1,014 families living in the village. The population density was 455.0 inhabitants per square mile (175.7/km^{2}). There were 1,341 housing units at an average density of 185.0 per square mile (71.4/km^{2}). The racial makeup of the village was 93.00% White, 3.03% African American, 0.03% Native American, 3.24% Asian, 0.09% from other races, and 0.61% from two or more races. Hispanic or Latino of any race were 0.67% of the population.

There were 1,286 households, out of which 31.8% had children under the age of 18 living with them, 72.5% were married couples living together, 4.9% had a female householder with no husband present, and 21.1% were non-families. 19.1% of all households were made up of individuals, and 9.7% had someone living alone who was 65 years of age or older. The average household size was 2.56 and the average family size was 2.93.

In the village, the population was spread out, with 23.1% under the age of 18, 4.3% from 18 to 24, 18.3% from 25 to 44, 36.5% from 45 to 64, and 17.7% who were 65 years of age or older. The median age was 48 years. For every 100 females, there were 94.2 males. For every 100 females age 18 and over, there were 91.3 males.

The median income for a household in the village was $113,977, and the median income for a family was $134,621. Males had a median income of $100,000 versus $42,054 for females. The per capita income for the village was $72,001. About 1.3% of families and 3.3% of the population were below the poverty line, including 3.7% of those under age 18 and 3.4% of those age 65 or over.

== Education ==
Moreland Hills is primarily served by the Orange City School System. Small parts of the village are served by the Chagrin Falls Exempted Village School District.

== Notable people ==
- James A. Garfield, 20th President of the United States (then named Orange Township)
- Ellis Burks, former Major League Baseball player and former special assistant to the general manager of the then Cleveland Indians
- Vanessa Bayer, actress and comedian, cast member on Saturday Night Live (2010-2017)
- Donna Kelce, banker and the mother of National Football League players Jason Kelce and Travis Kelce
- Robert E. Murray, CEO of Murray Energy Corporation
- Diana Munz, Olympic swimmer
