= Newburgh Heights, Ohio =

- Village
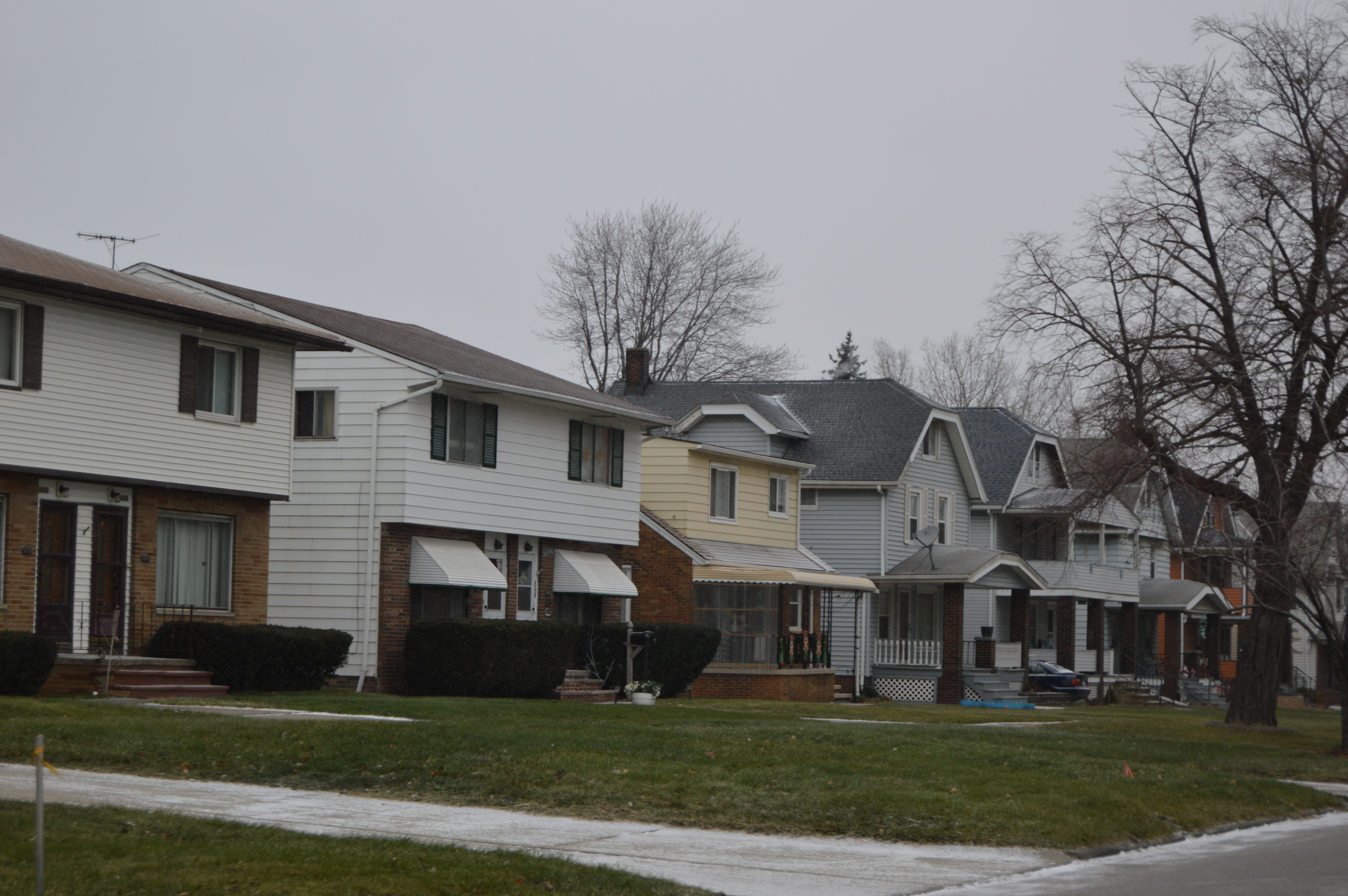
- Neighborhood on Washington Park Boulevard

- Flag Seal
- Interactive map of Newburgh Heights, Ohio
- Location within Ohio Location within the United States
- Coordinates: 41°26′59″N 81°39′37″W
- Country: United States
- State: Ohio
- County: Cuyahoga

Government
  - Type: Mayor-Council Government
  - Mayor: Trevor K. Elkins (D)

Area
  - Total: 0.58 sq mi (1.51 km^{2})
  - Land: 0.58 sq mi (1.51 km^{2})
  - Water: 0 sq mi (0.00 km^{2})
- Elevation: 692 ft (211 m)

Population (2020)
  - Total: 1,862
  - Density: 3,203.6/sq mi (1,236.92/km^{2})
- Time zone: UTC-5 (Eastern (EST))
  - Summer (DST): UTC-4 (EDT)
- ZIP codes: 44105, 44127
- Area code: 216
- FIPS code: 39-54250
- GNIS feature ID: 1065145
- Website: newburgh-oh.gov

Newburgh Heights is a village in Cuyahoga County, Ohio, United States. The population was 1,862 at the 2020 census. A suburb of Cleveland, it is a part of the Cleveland metropolitan area.

== Geography ==
Newburgh Heights is surrounded on three sides (west, north and east) by Washington Park Blvd, north of Harvard Avenue, and west of the Willow Freeway (I-77) at 41°27′N 81°40′W (41.450, -81.660).

According to the United States Census Bureau, the village has a total area of 0.58 square miles (1.50 km^{2}), all land.

== Demographics ==
Historical population
Census	Pop.	Note	%±
1910	940		—
1920	2,957		214.6%
1930	4,152		40.4%
1940	3,830		−7.8%
1950	3,689		−3.7%
1960	3,512		−4.8%
1970	3,396		−3.3%
1980	2,678		−21.1%
1990	2,310		−13.7%
2000	2,389		3.4%
2010	2,167		−9.3%
2020	1,862		−14.1%
U.S. Decennial Census

As of the 2000 census, the center of population in Cuyahoga County was located in Newburgh Heights, near East 26th Street.

96.0% spoke English, 3.4% Polish, and 0.7% Spanish.

=== 2020 census ===
Newburgh Heights village, Ohio – Racial and ethnic composition Note: the US Census treats Hispanic/Latino as an ethnic category. This table excludes Latinos from the racial categories and assigns them to a separate category. Hispanics/Latinos may be of any race.
Race / Ethnicity (NH = Non-Hispanic)	Pop 2000	Pop 2010	Pop 2020	% 2000	% 2010	% 2020
White alone (NH)	2,226	1,654	1,249	93.18%	76.33%	67.08%
Black or African American alone (NH)	71	322	338	2.97%	14.86%	18.15%
Native American or Alaska Native alone (NH)	5	3	2	0.21%	0.14%	0.11%
Asian alone (NH)	3	5	5	0.13%	0.23%	0.27%
Native Hawaiian or Pacific Islander alone (NH)	0	1	0	0.00%	0.05%	0.00%
Other race alone (NH)	1	6	22	0.04%	0.28%	1.18%
Mixed race or Multiracial (NH)	24	58	92	1.00%	2.68%	4.94%
Hispanic or Latino (any race)	59	118	154	2.47%	5.45%	8.27%
Total	2,389	2,167	1,862	100.00%	100.00%	100.00%

=== 2010 census ===
As of the census of 2010, there were 2,167 people, 958 households, and 536 families residing in the village. The population density was 3,736.2 inhabitants per square mile (1,442.6/km^{2}). There were 1,145 housing units at an average density of 1,974.1 per square mile (762.2/km^{2}). The racial makeup of the village was 79.1% White, 14.9% African American, 0.1% Native American, 0.3% Asian, 2.3% from other races, and 3.2% from two or more races. Hispanic or Latino of any race were 5.4% of the population.

There were 958 households, of which 30.7% had children under the age of 18 living with them, 28.7% were married couples living together, 19.1% had a female householder with no husband present, 8.1% had a male householder with no wife present, and 44.1% were non-families. 37.4% of all households were made up of individuals, and 10.7% had someone living alone who was 65 years of age or older. The average household size was 2.26 and the average family size was 2.96.

The median age in the village was 37.2 years. 24.8% of residents were under the age of 18; 8.7% were between the ages of 18 and 24; 25.5% were from 25 to 44; 28.4% were from 45 to 64; and 12.6% were 65 years of age or older. The gender makeup of the village was 51.0% male and 49.0% female.

=== 2000 census ===
As of the census of 2000, there were 2,389 people, 1,052 households, and 621 families residing in the village. The population density was 4,104.3 inhabitants per square mile (1,584.7/km^{2}). There were 1,157 housing units at an average density of 1,987.7 per square mile (767.5/km^{2}). The racial makeup of the village was 94.47% White, 3.14% African American, 0.21% Native American, 0.13% Asian, 0.54% from other races, and 1.51% from two or more races. Hispanic or Latino of any race were 2.47% of the population.

There were 1,052 households, out of which 25.4% had children under the age of 18 living with them, 36.8% were married couples living together, 17.4% had a female householder with no husband present, and 40.9% were non-families. 33.9% of all households were made up of individuals, and 11.8% had someone living alone who was 65 years of age or older. The average household size was 2.27 and the average family size was 2.91.

In the village, the population was spread out, with 21.6% under the age of 18, 8.9% from 18 to 24, 33.6% from 25 to 44, 22.4% from 45 to 64, and 13.5% who were 65 years of age or older. The median age was 37 years. For every 100 females there were 93.0 males. For every 100 females age 18 and over, there were 91.4 males.

The median income for a household in the village was $37,409, and the median income for a family was $42,131. Males had a median income of $37,650 versus $24,969 for females. The per capita income for the village was $18,636. About 9.2% of families and 12.0% of the population were below the poverty line, including 16.9% of those under age 18 and 5.3% of those age 65 or over.

== Political controversy ==
Former mayor Trevor Elkins was accused of illegally using campaign funds for personal reasons from 2015 to 2019. Elkins spent $134,705 over the course of 651 occasions for personal expenditures when those funds cannot be used for such purposes, even if reimbursed by Elkins. He also paid a political consulting firm he owns $8,400 from campaign funds. The Franklin County Prosecutor's Office is expected to take up the case and has said that a felony charge is "fully on the table." The Ohio Elections Commission has voted to refer the case for prosecution by a vote of 5-2. Elkins also has admitted to misusing more than $134,100 of his campaign funds on 650 occasions from 2015 to 2019, using a campaign debit card to cover routine personal expenses. He said he always repaid the account and did not realize what he was doing was illegal until it was pointed out to him.

Former Newburgh Heights mayor Trevor Elkins, accused of elections-related offenses, agreed to plead guilty to three misdemeanor charges. According to the Franklin County Prosecutor's Office, Elkins agreed that he will plead guilty to one count of attempted theft in office and two counts of attempted election falsification. He also agreed to step down from his position as mayor once he entered those guilty pleas. Prosecutors accused Elkins of dipping into his campaign account 650 times between 2015 and 2019, totaling more than $134,000. Elkins told the Ohio Elections Commission last month that he put his own money into the campaign account and sometimes withdrew it for personal use. "It's like a bank robbery," special prosecutor Brian Simms told FOX 8. "You commit a bank robbery, and you return to the bank and give them back their money. Well, guess what? You still committed a bank robbery." The prosecutor's office also says Elkins agreed to shut down his campaign account and can not run for any Cuyahoga County elected office for the 2024-2028 term.

Trevor Elkins is currently Mayor of Newburgh Heights again, as of the last election in 2024.

== Traffic enforcement ==
Newburgh Heights is a nationally-known speed trap, employing traffic cameras along a very short stretch of Interstate 77 that runs through it. In addition, traffic cameras are employed in the stretch of Harvard Avenue that leads to the I-77 on ramp. The penalties range from $150.00 to $300.00.

Former mayor Trevor Elkins said in 2017 his village issues about 300 speeding tickets per week from using its one hand-held camera. He said the system is safer than when officers pull over speeding drivers, and he disagreed with critics who might say the camera is a cash grab. "The people who are speeding are not victims," Elkins said. "They were breaking the law, and they got caught." 25% of the city revenue comes from traffic tickets. The national average is at least ten times lower, at approximately 2%.

Mayor Elkins has stated publicly that he defends the use of the cameras and admits they generate revenue, and said in 2016, "do I recognize that they generate revenue? Absolutely. Do I apologize for that? No."

As of July 3, 2019, Ohio Governor Mike DeWine signed into law legislation that reduces state funding for any city, town, or village operating red light or speed cameras by an amount equivalent to the fines collected. (The provision withholding state funding has been enjoined by the 8th District Court of Appeals) The law requires all appeals of tickets received through camera technology to be heard in court rather than by an administrative officer.
