= Orange, Ohio =

- Village
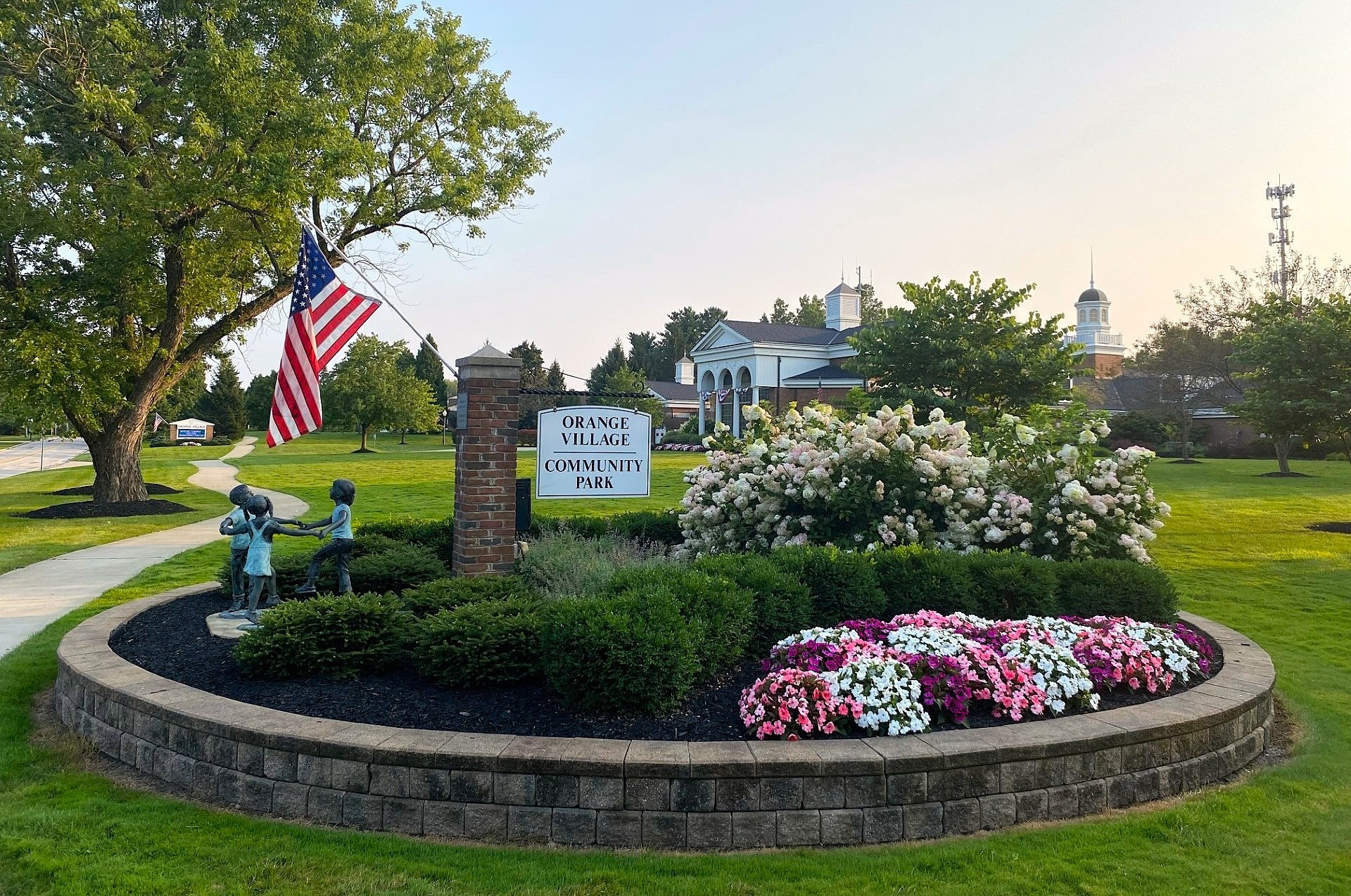
- Orange Village Community Park

- Flag Seal
- Motto: "A Community for all Generations"
- Interactive map of Orange, Ohio
- Location within Ohio Location within the United States
- Coordinates: 41°26′44″N 81°28′31″W
- Country: United States
- State: Ohio
- County: Cuyahoga

Government
  - Mayor: Judson Kline (D)

Area
  - Total: 3.83 sq mi (9.91 km^{2})
  - Land: 3.81 sq mi (9.87 km^{2})
  - Water: 0.015 sq mi (0.04 km^{2})
- Elevation: 1,158 ft (353 m)

Population (2020)
  - Total: 3,421
  - Density: 898.1/sq mi (346.76/km^{2})
- Time zone: UTC-5 (Eastern (EST))
  - Summer (DST): UTC-4 (EDT)
- ZIP code: 44022
- Area codes: 440, 216
- FIPS code: 39-58604
- GNIS feature ID: 1065211
- Website: https://www.orangevillage.com/

Orange is a village in eastern Cuyahoga County, Ohio, United States. The population was 3,421 at the 2020 census. An affluent eastern suburb of Cleveland, it is part of the Cleveland metropolitan area.

== History ==
Orange Township was settled in 1815 and established as a township in 1820. As part of the settlement of the Connecticut Western Reserve, Serenus Bumett was the first settler in the township. The name "Orange" was chosen because several of the early settlers had migrated from Orange, Connecticut. In 1831, Orange Township was the birthplace of President James A. Garfield. However, since then, Orange Township has been divided into five parts. These are Orange Village, Hunting Valley, Moreland Hills, Pepper Pike and Woodmere. Garfield's birth and early childhood occurred in modern-day Moreland Hills.

Orange Village, the southwest quadrant of the original township, was incorporated as a village in 1929.

== Geography ==
According to the United States Census Bureau, the village has a total area of 3.82 square miles (9.89 km^{2}), of which 3.80 square miles (9.84 km^{2}) is land and 0.02 square miles (0.05 km^{2}) is water. The affluent village is the home of the scenic Beechmont Country Club golf course, and of the 63-acre Orange Village Park.

== Demographics ==
Historical population
Census	Pop.	Note	%±
1930	266		—
1940	492		85.0%
1950	897		82.3%
1960	2,006		123.6%
1970	2,112		5.3%
1980	2,376		12.5%
1990	2,810		18.3%
2000	3,236		15.2%
2010	3,323		2.7%
2020	3,421		2.9%
U.S. Decennial Census

=== Racial and ethnic composition ===
Orange village, Ohio – Racial and ethnic composition Note: the US Census treats Hispanic/Latino as an ethnic category. This table excludes Latinos from the racial categories and assigns them to a separate category. Hispanics/Latinos may be of any race.
Race / Ethnicity (NH = Non-Hispanic)	Pop 2000	Pop 2010	Pop 2020	% 2000	% 2010	% 2020
White alone (NH)	2,629	2,535	2,557	81.24%	76.29%	74.74%
Black or African American alone (NH)	405	475	382	12.52%	14.29%	11.17%
Native American or Alaska Native alone (NH)	2	1	0	0.06%	0.03%	0.00%
Asian alone (NH)	136	189	265	4.20%	5.69%	7.75%
Native Hawaiian or Pacific Islander alone (NH)	3	2	0	0.09%	0.06%	0.00%
Other race alone (NH)	3	5	8	0.09%	0.15%	0.23%
Mixed race or Multiracial (NH)	35	64	143	1.08%	1.93%	4.18%
Hispanic or Latino (any race)	23	52	66	0.71%	1.56%	1.93%
Total	3,236	3,323	3,421	100.00%	100.00%	100.00%

=== 2020 census ===
As of the 2020 census, there were 3,421 people in the village.

The median age was 48.2 years. 21.3% of residents were under the age of 18, and 24.7% were 65 years of age or older. For every 100 females there were 94.5 males, and for every 100 females age 18 and over there were 92.4 males age 18 and over.

100.0% of residents lived in urban areas, while 0.0% lived in rural areas.

There were 1,358 households, of which 32.0% had children under the age of 18 living in them. Of all households, 63.3% were married-couple households, 13.2% were households with a male householder and no spouse or partner present, and 20.2% were households with a female householder and no spouse or partner present. About 21.0% of all households were made up of individuals, and 10.9% had someone living alone who was 65 years of age or older.

There were 1,444 housing units, of which 6.0% were vacant. The homeowner vacancy rate was 1.0% and the rental vacancy rate was 11.3%. The population density was 900.3 inhabitants per square mile (347.6/km^{2}), and housing density was 380 per square mile (146.7/km^{2}).

=== Demographic estimates ===
The foreign-born population was 13.5%.

=== Income and poverty ===
The average family size was 2.81, and the median household income was $167,148.

=== 2010 census ===
As of the census of 2010, there were 3,323 people, 1,277 households, and 973 families living in the village. The population density was 874.5 inhabitants per square mile (337.6/km^{2}). There were 1,374 housing units at an average density of 361.6 per square mile (139.6/km^{2}). The racial makeup of the village was 77.1% White, 14.4% African American, 0.1% Native American, 5.7% Asian, 0.1% Pacific Islander, 0.7% from other races, and 1.9% from two or more races. Hispanic or Latino of any race were 1.6% of the population.

There were 1,277 households, of which 33.4% had children under the age of 18 living with them, 64.1% were married couples living together, 8.6% had a female householder with no husband present, 3.4% had a male householder with no wife present, and 23.8% were non-families. 21.4% of all households were made up of individuals, and 10.9% had someone living alone who was 65 years of age or older. The average household size was 2.59 and the average family size was 3.03.

The median age in the village was 46.8 years. 24.8% of residents were under the age of 18; 5.3% were between the ages of 18 and 24; 17.8% were from 25 to 44; 34.1% were from 45 to 64; and 18.1% were 65 years of age or older. The gender makeup of the village was 48.1% male and 51.9% female.

=== 2000 census ===
As of the census of 2000, there were 3,236 people, 1,170 households, and 959 families living in the village. The population density was 851.4 inhabitants per square mile (328.7/km^{2}). There were 1,236 housing units at an average density of 325.2 per square mile (125.6/km^{2}). The racial makeup of the village was 81.46% White, 12.64% African American, 0.06% Native American, 4.20% Asian, 0.09% Pacific Islander, 0.25% from other races, and 1.30% from two or more races. Hispanic or Latino of any race were 0.71% of the population. 12.3% were of American, 9.1% Russian, 6.8% German, 6.4% Italian, 6.3% Hungarian, 5.7% English, and 1.1% Israeli ancestry according to Census 2000. 98.3% spoke English and 1.0% Hebrew as their first language.

There were 1,170 households, out of which 41.6% had children under the age of 18 living with them, 71.5% were married couples living together, 8.5% had a female householder with no husband present, and 18.0% were non-families. 16.3% of all households were made up of individuals, and 9.1% had someone living alone who was 65 years of age or older. The average household size was 2.75 and the average family size was 3.10.

In the village, the population was spread out, with 28.8% under the age of 18, 3.4% from 18 to 24, 21.8% from 25 to 44, 29.4% from 45 to 64, and 16.6% who were 65 years of age or older. The median age was 43 years. For every 100 females there were 97.1 males. For every 100 females age 18 and over, there were 89.9 males.

The median income for a household in the village was $89,660, and the median income for a family was $102,206. Males had a median income of $77,865 versus $37,667 for females. The per capita income for the village was $46,296. About 2.3% of families and 3.6% of the population were below the poverty line, including 5.2% of those under age 18 and 1.1% of those age 65 or over.

== Schools ==
Orange Village is served by the Orange City School System.
