= Orange High School (Ohio) =

Public school in Ohio, United States

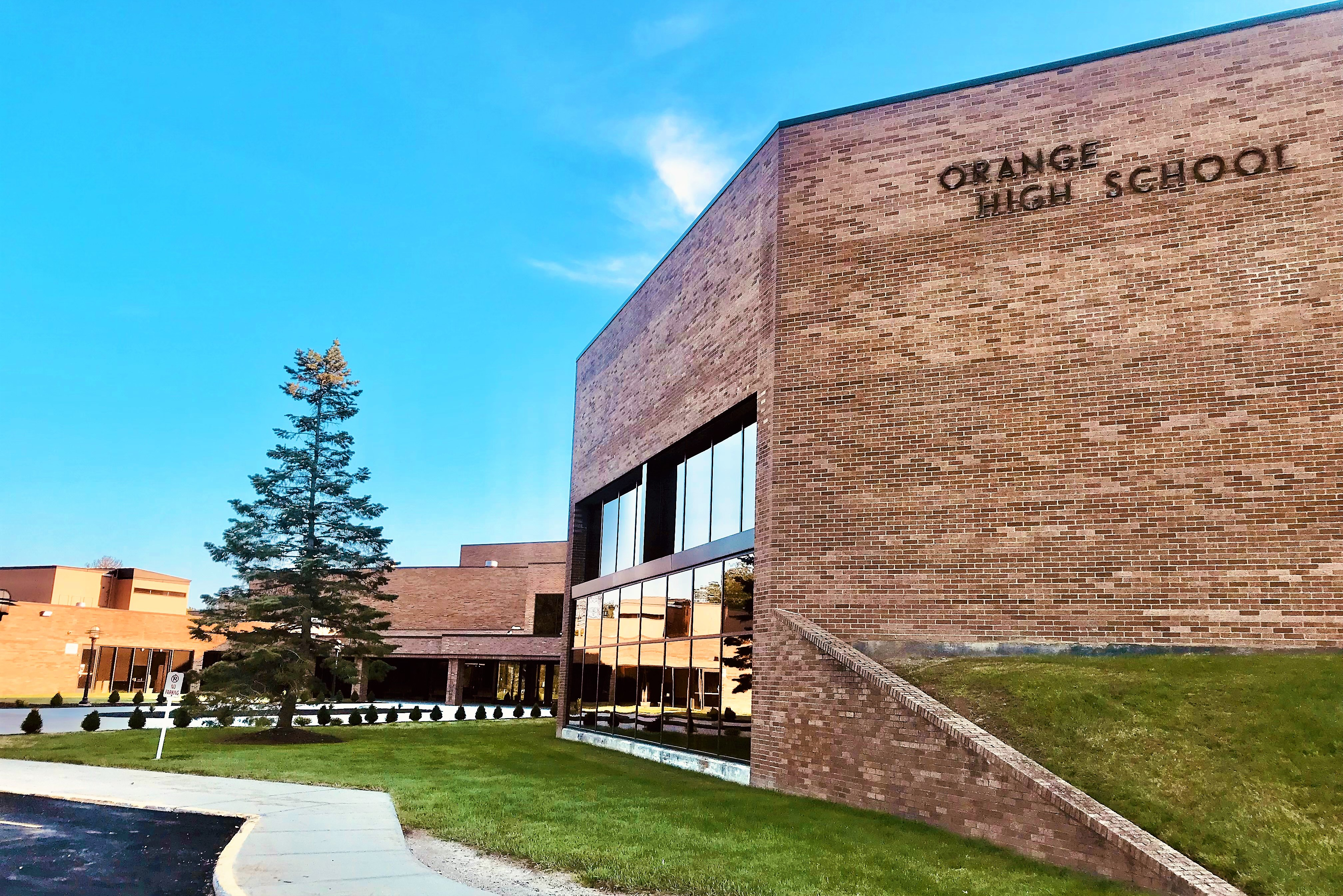

Location
- 32000 Chagrin Boulevard; Pepper Pike, Ohio 44124; United States; 41°27′28″N 81°27′15″W

Information
- Type: Public
- Established: 1924
- School district: Orange City School District
- NCES School ID: 391001602600
- Principal: Jamie Hogue
- Teaching staff: 48.40 (on a FTE basis)
- Grades: 9–12
- Enrollment: 617 (2024–25)
- Student to teacher ratio: 12.75
- Campus type: Suburban
- Colors: Orange and black
- Fight song: Buckeye Battle Cry
- Athletics conference: Chagrin Valley Conference
- Nickname: Lions
- Accreditation: Ohio Department of Education
- Newspaper: The Orange Outlook
- Yearbook: ORAN (Orange Annual)
- Website: www.orangeschools.org/orange-high-school-home

Orange High School (OHS) is a public high school located in Pepper Pike, Ohio, United States, an eastern suburb in the Greater Cleveland metropolitan area of Northeast Ohio. OHS is the only high school in the Orange City School District.

== History ==
In 1924 the Orange Schools were consolidated from the individually operated Orange Township public schools. That year, the Foreman family donated the first 10 acres (40,000 m^{2}) of property to ultimately comprise a 172-acre (0.70 km^{2}) school district campus and the first Orange Schools building was opened on the current site of the high school. In 1973, the current Orange High School's contemporary structure was expanded upon, built around and opened on the site of the original school building.

The Orange School District serves more than 2,200 students living in Hunting Valley, Moreland Hills, Orange Village, Pepper Pike, and Woodmere. Students living in portions of Bedford Heights, Solon, Gates Mills, and Warrensville Heights also attend Orange Schools.

== State championships ==
- Boys' track and field – 1944
- Girls' tennis - 2014
- Mock Trial - 2016
- Boys' tennis - 2021, 2025

== Notable alumni ==
- George Stephanopoulos, politician and news commentator
- Rick Glassman, actor and comedian
- Vanessa Bayer, actor and comedian
