= Bedford, Ohio =

- City
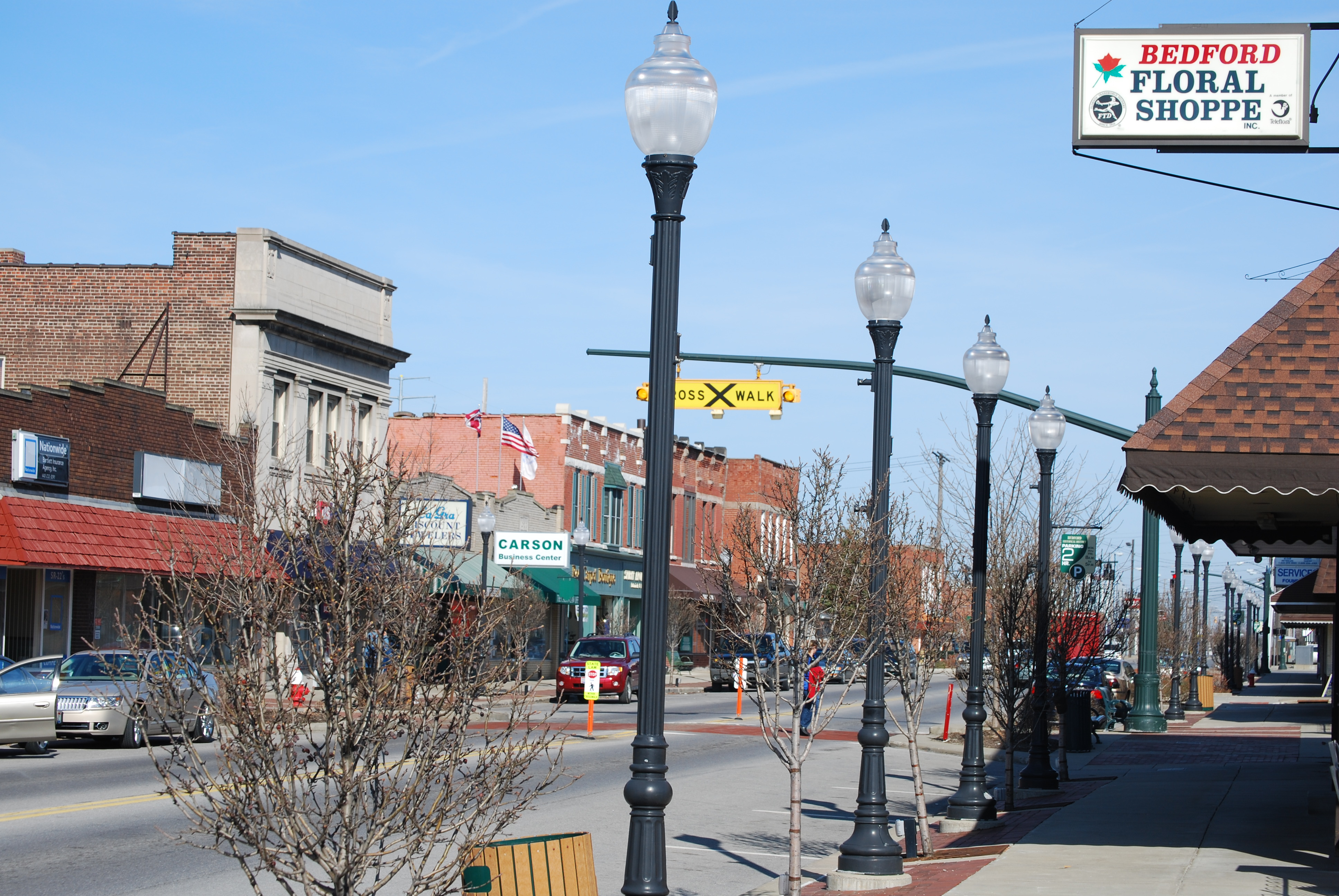
- Broadway Avenue in Bedford

- Flag Seal
- Nickname: Bedford Falls (in reference to the town in the movie It's A Wonderful Life)
- Interactive map of Bedford, Ohio
- Location within Ohio Location within the United States
- Coordinates: 41°22′54″N 81°31′48″W
- Country: United States
- State: Ohio
- County: Cuyahoga
- Established: 1837

Government
  - Mayor: Stan Koci (D)

Area
  - Total: 5.39 sq mi (13.96 km^{2})
  - Land: 5.34 sq mi (13.83 km^{2})
  - Water: 0.050 sq mi (0.13 km^{2}) 0.93%
- Elevation: 945 ft (288 m)

Population (2020)
  - Total: 13,149
  - Estimate (2023): 12,767
  - Density: 2,461.6/sq mi (950.42/km^{2})
- Time zone: UTC-4 (EST)
  - Summer (DST): UTC-4 (EDT)
- Zip code: 44146
- Area code: 440
- FIPS code: 39-04878
- GNIS feature ID: 1085951
- Website: http://www.bedfordoh.gov

Bedford is a city in Cuyahoga County, Ohio, United States. The population was 13,149 at the 2020 census. It is an eastern suburb of Cleveland.

== History ==
The area that is now Bedford and northeastern Ohio was originally inhabited by Native Americans as early as 11,000 years ago. By 1662 the area was declared a part of the Connecticut Colony through royal charter. Much of the colony's land, which extended to the Pacific Ocean, was ceded to the early U.S. government, but a few million acres west of the border of Pennsylvania became what was known as the Western Reserve.

Bedford began as part of the Connecticut Western Reserve in 1797. A large portion of the Western Reserve was sold to the Connecticut Land Company in 1795. Surveying of the land began shortly after and was spearheaded by Moses Cleaveland. Seth Pease and Amzi Atwater surveyed Lot 46, which eventually would become Bedford Township. It was surveyed as township 6, range 11.

The first settlers to the area started to arrive in 1813. Early settlers to the region were drawn to Tinkers Creek and the hardwood forests. Waterfalls on Tinkers Creek were ideal for mills, which would power local businesses. The first mill in Bedford Township was built by Adams and Starr in 1815. It was situated at the mouth of Tinkers Creek. The first official settler to the area was Elijah Nobles. He settled here in 1810 in the western part of the township on one of the 100 lots surveyed.

More settlers followed, including Benjamin Franklin Fitch, who founded the Taylor Chair Company in 1816. He began making chairs at his home, which was located at Warrensville Center and Libby Roads in present-day Maple Heights, Ohio. The company did not close until 2012, making it the longest-running manufacturing company in the Western Reserve area. Fitch made chairs that were considered to be better than others because of his use of pre-shrunk wood that prevented creaking. He is also known for inventing the strap lathe, a tool that would become standard in furniture making.

Bedford Township was officially founded in 1823 and Township 6 was renamed Bedford Township by Daniel Benedict who originated from Bedford, New York. The original township covered what today includes Bedford, Bedford Heights, Maple Heights, Oakwood Village, and Walton Hills.

In 1834, the First Baptist Church was established to help meet the religious needs of the growing population in the area. The first church in Bedford was the First Baptist Church, founded with just 14 original members at the home of Hezekiah Dunham. In 1893, the church moved into its first dedicated building located on the Bedford Commons. The old First Baptist Church is a stone building done in the Late Gothic Revival style and was designed by architect Jacob Snyder. In 1968, the First Baptist Church moved to its present location at the corner of Turney Road and West Glendale Avenue. The old stone church still stands though and is owned by the Bedford Historical Society. It currently serves as a community building and a rental hall.

Bedford became an incorporated village on March 15, 1837. In 1837, the population of Bedford Township had grown to be 475 people and at that time, the residents petitioned to become the Village of Bedford, which sits at the geographic center of Bedford Township. At this time, Hezekiah Dunham, who was a prominent and wealthy local business man, and his wife, Clarissa Dunham, donated three acres of land for the village to be able to build a public square as well as other public and religious buildings. The deed for the land stated the property was to be "used as a public square forever."

In addition to the falls on Tinkers Creek and the abundant forests, transportation helped Bedford to grow. Before the roads were even built, Bedford was situated along the main route between Pittsburgh and Cleveland and was an important stagecoach stop. Today this is State Route 14, which runs through town from the northwest to southeast.

Transportation became even more important in the area when the Ohio and Erie Canal opened in 1827 and the Cleveland & Pittsburgh Railroad began in 1852. Both of these helped drive more industry to the area, and by 1840 the population of Bedford was 2,021. Another railroad, the Connotton Valley Railroad, opened in 1881.

In 1927, the Bedford Municipal Hospital was built. The original hospital still stands, though it has been heavily added onto since it was first constructed. It is now operated as a branch of University Hospitals of Cleveland.

The village of Maple Heights left Bedford Township in 1915 and in 1932 Maple Heights achieved city status.

In 1932, the Village of Bedford adopted a city manager government and charger and became the City of Bedford. As the village grew, many industries developed in Bedford and new businesses opened. Some of the important businesses in Bedford were manufacturing companies:

- The Marble & Shattuck Chair Company operated in Bedford from 1885 to 1894, when it moved to Cleveland.
- The B.L. Marble Chair Co. made wooden chairs from 1894.
- Founded in 1903, the Franklin Oil and Gas Company made engine oil and similar products.
- The Best Foundry Co., founded in 1905 manufactured metal castings, especially stoves.
- The McMyler-Interstate Company, established in 1910, was the largest manufacturer in Bedford. It made the largest crane in the world in 1919.
- Founded in 1922, the Walker China Company made marbles before manufacturing china.
- The Harper Aircraft Manufacturing Company built monoplanes beginning in 1930.
- In 1938, the Lewis Welding and Engineering Corporation opened and was an important supplier for the military during World War II.

The first car dealerships opened on Broadway Avenue in the early 1950s and formed the Bedford Automile Dealers Association in 1956, formally creating the first Bedford Automile. The Bedford Automile Dealers Association was created to not only give the car dealerships in the area a unified voice for working with the city but to also create a group who would actively help to improve the city.

On February 20, 1951, the northeast corner of Bedford Township broke off from the City of Bedford and incorporated to become the village of Bedford Heights, Ohio. Bedford Heights achieved city status in 1961.

On February 20, 2023, an explosion occurred at a I. Schumann & Co. copper alloy plant in Bedford, causing a large fire and catastrophic damage to the facility and numerous cars in a lot across the street. According to authorities, 14 people were hospitalized for burn injuries, including a 46 year old factory worker, who later succumbed to them after being admitted in critical condition.

== Geography ==
Bedford is a first ring suburb to the southeast of Cleveland. The city is bounded by Maple Heights to the north and west, Walton Hills and Oakwood to the south, and Bedford Heights to the east.

According to the 2010 census, the city has a total area of 5.40 square miles (14.0 km^{2}), of which 5.35 square miles (13.9 km^{2}) (or 99.07%) is land and 0.05 square miles (0.13 km^{2}) (or 0.93%) is water.

The boundaries of the city of Bedford include part of the Bedford Reservation. The reservation includes Tinker's Creek, which flows through a gorge that has been listed as a National Natural Landmark. The Great Falls of Tinker's Creek are within the city limits of Bedford.

== Demographics ==
Historical population
Census	Pop.	Note	%±
1850	1,853		—
1860	1,098		−40.7%
1870	828		−24.6%
1880	768		−7.2%
1890	1,043		35.8%
1900	1,486		42.5%
1910	3,791		155.1%
1920	4,582		20.9%
1930	6,814		48.7%
1940	7,390		8.5%
1950	9,105		23.2%
1960	15,223		67.2%
1970	17,552		15.3%
1980	15,003		−14.5%
1990	14,822		−1.2%
2000	14,214		−4.1%
2010	13,074		−8.0%
2020	13,149		0.6%
2023 (est.)	12,767		−2.9%

96.2% spoke English, 1.3% Spanish, and 0.9% Polish at home.

=== Racial and ethnic composition ===
Bedford city, Ohio – Racial and ethnic composition Note: the US Census treats Hispanic/Latino as an ethnic category. This table excludes Latinos from the racial categories and assigns them to a separate category. Hispanics/Latinos may be of any race.
Race / Ethnicity (NH = Non-Hispanic)	Pop 2000	Pop 2010	Pop 2020	% 2000	% 2010	% 2020
White alone (NH)	11,145	6,593	5,252	78.41%	53.26%	39.94%
Black or African American alone (NH)	2,498	5,417	6,835	17.57%	41.43%	51.98%
Native American or Alaska Native alone (NH)	22	20	25	0.15%	0.15%	0.19%
Asian alone (NH)	153	112	103	1.08%	0.86%	0.78%
Native Hawaiian or Pacific Islander alone (NH)	2	0	7	0.01%	0.00%	0.05%
Other race alone (NH)	28	24	40	0.20%	0.18%	0.30%
Mixed race or Multiracial (NH)	214	282	491	1.51%	2.16%	3.73%
Hispanic or Latino (any race)	152	256	396	1.07%	1.96%	3.01%
Total	14,214	13,074	13,149	100.00%	100.00%	100.00%

=== 2020 census ===
As of the 2020 census, Bedford had a population of 13,149. The median age was 44.3 years. 18.1% of residents were under the age of 18 and 19.5% of residents were 65 years of age or older. For every 100 females there were 84.7 males, and for every 100 females age 18 and over there were 80.9 males age 18 and over.

100.0% of residents lived in urban areas, while 0% lived in rural areas.

There were 6,608 households in Bedford, of which 21.7% had children under the age of 18 living in them. Of all households, 25.2% were married-couple households, 24.8% were households with a male householder and no spouse or partner present, and 43.6% were households with a female householder and no spouse or partner present. About 44.8% of all households were made up of individuals and 17.8% had someone living alone who was 65 years of age or older.

There were 7,146 housing units, of which 7.5% were vacant. Among occupied housing units, 50.1% were owner-occupied and 49.9% were renter-occupied. The homeowner vacancy rate was 2.4% and the rental vacancy rate was 7.0%.

Racial composition as of the 2020 census
Race	Number	Percent
White	5,340	40.6%
Black or African American	6,882	52.3%
American Indian and Alaska Native	26	0.2%
Asian	108	0.8%
Native Hawaiian and Other Pacific Islander	7	0.1%
Some other race	162	1.2%
Two or more races	624	4.7%
Hispanic or Latino (of any race)	396	3.0%

=== 2010 census ===
As of the census of 2010, there were 13,074 people, 6,265 households, and 3,346 families residing in the city. The population density was 2,443.7 inhabitants per square mile (943.5/km^{2}). There were 6,951 housing units at an average density of 1,299.3 per square mile (501.7/km^{2}). The racial makeup of the city was 53.9% White, 41.9% African American, 0.2% Native American, 0.9% Asian, 0.6% from other races, and 2.5% from two or more races. Hispanic or Latino of any race were 2.0% of the population.

There were 6,265 households, of which 25.5% had children under the age of 18 living with them, 31.2% were married couples living together, 17.4% had a female householder with no husband present, 4.9% had a male householder with no wife present, and 46.6% were non-families. 41.7% of all households were made up of individuals, and 16% had someone living alone who was 65 years of age or older. The average household size was 2.08 and the average family size was 2.83.

The median age in the city was 41.9 years. 21.2% of residents were under the age of 18; 7.3% were between the ages of 18 and 24; 25.4% were from 25 to 44; 28.9% were from 45 to 64; and 17% were 65 years of age or older. The gender makeup of the city was 45.8% male and 54.2% female.

=== 2000 census ===
As of the census of 2000, there were 14,214 people, 6,659 households, and 3,682 families residing in the city. The population density was 2,653.3 inhabitants per square mile (1,024.4/km^{2}). There were 7,062 housing units at an average density of 1,318.2 per square mile (509.0/km^{2}). The racial makeup of the city was 79.01% White, 17.63% Black, 0.17% Native American, 1.08% Asian, 0.01% Pacific Islander, 0.47% from other races, and 1.62% from two or more races. Hispanic or Latino of any race were 1.07% of the population.

There were 6,659 households, out of which 23.1% had children under the age of 18 living with them, 39.4% were married couples living together, 12.1% had a female householder with no husband present, and 44.7% were non-families. 39.0% of all households were made up of individuals, and 16.2% had someone living alone who was 65 years of age or older. The average household size was 2.1 and the average family size was 2.85.

In the city, the population was spread out, with 20.5% under the age of 18, 6.9% from 18 to 24, 33.0% from 25 to 44, 20.9% from 45 to 64, and 18.7% who were 65 years of age or older. The median age was 39 years. For every 100 females, there were 89.3 males. For every 100 females age 18 and over, there were 85.6 males.

The median income for a household in the city was $36,943, and the median income for a family was $47,142. Males had a median income of $36,524 versus $27,851 for females. The per capita income for the city was $20,076. About 5.5% of families and 7.6% of the population were below the poverty line, including 9.2% of those under age 18 and 8.1% of those age 65 or over.

== Economy ==
In addition to the important commercial districts of the Automile and Historic District, Bedford is home to a few large companies that employ many residents in the area. Xellia Pharmaceuticals, a company owned by Danish Novo Holdings A/S, opened a manufacturing facility in Bedford in 2017.

Art of Beauty is another big employer in Bedford. The beauty supply company is most well known for its Zoya brand of nail polishes and nail care products.

Nature Stone Flooring is a local company that makes epoxy stone flooring materials. The epoxy resin used is patent pending and the company, founded in 1989, is the largest maker of this type of flooring.

Another large employer in Bedford is the University Hospitals Bedford Medical Center. The medical center staffs 193 physicians and numerous other healthcare workers.

== Arts and culture ==
There are two main commercial districts in Bedford, the Automile and the Bedford Historic District. The Automile, which lies along Rockside Road and Broadway, was formally established in 1956 to promote the interests of the auto dealerships and to help these companies work together to give back to the community.

The Bedford Automile is the largest collection of new and used automotive dealerships in Ohio. There are currently 24 dealerships. Together the Automile companies have raised money for a number of charitable causes, including breast cancer awareness, Cleveland's homeless population, and Bedford High School scholarships.

The Historic District is located downtown and is listed on the National Register of Historic Places. The Bedford Baptist Church, Hezekiah Dunham House, and Holsey Gates House are included on the Register. The area is approximately bounded by Broadway, Columbus, Franklin, and Willis. The District also includes the Bedford Public Square and several other historic buildings: the Gates Handyside House, Franklin Victorian House, Moody House, and numerous commercial buildings dating to the 1890s to 1920s.

== Transportation ==
One of the main roads through Bedford is Ohio State Route 14 (OH-14). It runs northwest to southeast and follows the original stagecoach route between Cleveland and Pittsburgh. Within Bedford city limits, OH-14 is known as Broadway Avenue. Other main roads in Bedford include:

- Columbus Road runs from the northeast to the Bedford Reservation.
- Northfield Road (OH-8) runs north and south on the east side of the city.
- Center Road runs north and south through the center of town.
- Rockside Road runs east and west along the north edge of town.

Bedford is served by the Greater Cleveland Regional Transit Authority. Bus route 76: Broadway – Turney travels between downtown Cleveland and the Southgate Transit Center in Maple Heights with several stops in downtown Bedford. Route 90F: Broadway – Libby travels between downtown Cleveland and Oakwood Village with stops in Bedford along Northfield Road.

== Education ==
Bedford is served by the Bedford City School District, which also serves the communities of Bedford Heights, Oakwood, and Walton Hills. There are approximately 3,400 students in the district, which covers an area of 22 square miles. There are six schools:

- Glendale Primary School
- Central Primary School
- Columbus Intermediate School
- Carylwood Intermediate School
- Heskett Middle School
- Bedford High School

In Bedford, 86.3 percent of students are enrolled in the public school system. There are only a few private school and private special education options in Bedford.

Safely Home offers residential and outpatient programs for young people with special education needs and behavioral challenges. The Safely Home School provides specialized educational programming for students who have not been successful in traditional schools. Education Alternatives, non-profit educational agency, serves at-risk students in several Cleveland-area locations, including Bedford.

The Cuyahoga County Public Library Southeast Branch is located in Bedford. Educational youth services include free, after school mentoring and homework assistance. The branch also hosts Aspire Greater Cleveland services, which include adult literacy, GED, English as a second language, and job skills training.

== Notable people ==
- Mozelle Alderson, classic female blues singer
- Halle Berry, actress
- Eric Beverly, football player for Detroit Lions
- Chris Chambers, football player for Kansas City Chiefs
- Lou Diamond, marine
- Mike Easler, Major League Baseball player and coach
- Lee Evans, football player for Buffalo Bills
- Elmer Flick, Major League Baseball player
- Henry A. Lathrop, Wisconsin state legislator and physician
- Oliver Ocasek, Ohio state legislator
- Augustus Herman Pettibone, U.S. Representative
- Tyvis Powell, football player for BC Lions
- Phoebe Robinson, comedian and writer
- Rodger Saffold III, offensive guard for Buffalo Bills
- Tim Taylor, Cleveland-area newscaster and radio personality
- Charles G. Thomas, Wisconsin state legislator
- Archibald Willard, painter of The Spirit of '76
