= Bedford City School District =

School district in Ohio, United States

Location
- Cuyahoga County, Ohio; United States
- Coordinates: 41°23′33″N 81°32′04″W

District information
- Type: Public school district
- Grades: PK to 12
- Superintendent: Dr. Cassandra Johnson
- NCES District ID: 3910017

Students and staff
- Enrollment: 2,919 (2020-2021)
- Staff: 193.15 (on an FTE basis)
- Student–teacher ratio: 15.11

Other information
- District size: 22 mi^{2} (57 km^{2})
- Website: www.bedford.k12.oh.us

The Bedford City School District is a school district located in Cuyahoga County, Ohio, serving the communities of Bedford, Bedford Heights, Oakwood, and Walton Hills. The district educates about 3,000 students from pre-kindergarten to 12th grade.

== Schools ==
=== High school ===
- Bedford High School

=== Middle school ===
- Heskett Middle School

=== Primary and intermediate schools ===
- Central Primary School
- Glendale Primary School
- Carylwood Intermediate School
- Columbus Intermediate School

=== Alternative Education ===
- Excel Academy
