= Jimmy Dimora =

American politician (born 1955)

James C. "Jimmy" Dimora (born June 21, 1955 in Cleveland) is an American politician who served as Cuyahoga County Commissioner from 1998 until 2010, and as chairman of the county Democratic Party from 1994 until 2009. Before being elected county commissioner, Dimora served as mayor of Bedford Heights, Ohio for 17 years. In 2012 Dimora was convicted of 32 charges including racketeering, bribery, conspiracy, and tax charges and sentenced to 28 years in federal prison in one of the largest criminal corruption cases in Ohio history. He was originally serving his sentence at the Federal Medical Center, Devens in Ayer, Massachusetts, with a release date of 2031. His inmate number was 56275–060.

He graduated from Bedford High School in 1973.

He was released from prison into home confinement under the Coronavirus Aid, Relief, and Economic Security (CARES) Act on June 9, 2023.

The corruption case led to a change in the nature of the county government: one year after the beginning of the case, "county voters elected to change the form of government from commission-based to one with a county executive."

On December 12, 2024, President Joe Biden commuted his sentence.
