= 2023 Bedford explosion =

Industrial disaster in Bedford, Ohio

- Date: February 20, 2023
- Location: Bedford, Ohio, U.S.; 41.3572905°N 81.5209529°W
- Cause: Explosion
- Deaths: 1
- Injuries: 13

The 2023 Bedford explosion took place on February 20, 2023 in Bedford, Ohio, US. The explosion occurred at a I. Schumann & Co. copper alloy plant, and caused a large fire and catastrophic damage to the facility and damaged multiple cars in a lot across the street. The explosion was heard by civilians outside of the plant, and by 3:00pm, fire crews from multiple cities were then sent to 22500 block on Alexander Road where the explosion took place. The official address of the building is in Bedford, but it is considered Oakwood Village. According to authorities, 14 people were hospitalized for burn injuries, including a 46 year old factory worker, who later succumbed to them after being admitted in critical condition.

An Occupational Safety and Health Administration investigation found that the company "failed to protect workers from the hazard of steam explosions".

== Casualties ==
According to media outlets, 13 people were hospitalized for injuries, and a 46 year old plant worker, Steve Mullins, was killed.

== See also ==
- 2023 Ohio train derailment
