= Charles G. Thomas =

American politician

Charles G. Thomas (August 21, 1835 in Bedford, Ohio – December 24, 1916) was a member of the Wisconsin State Assembly during the 1883 and 1885 sessions. A Republican, he represented Richland County, Wisconsin. He was born on August 21, 1835, in Bedford, Ohio.
