= Harper Aircraft Manufacturing Company =

Defunct American aircraft manufacturer

The Harper Aircraft Manufacturing Company, also known as Harper Aircraft Company, was a manufacturer of airplanes in the early 1930s. Jack L. Harper was the company president and founder. The Harper Aircraft Company was located in Bedford, Ohio.

The Harper Aircraft Company built a small monoplane powered by a 35 hp Szekely three-cylinder engine. The company also built the "Roberts Special," powered by a 65-horsepower LeBlond engine, it was a standard Harper airplane with a special variable wing.
