= Bedford Automile =

The Bedford Automile is an area of Bedford, Ohio, United States, that has been set aside specifically for car dealerships. The Bedford Automile was officially created in 1956 by the Bedford Automile Dealers Association to create a unified group to speak for the car dealerships in the area. It has since grown to include 26 new and used car dealerships and currently employs about 1,700 employees. It is widely regarded as one of the largest congregations of car dealerships in Ohio.

The Bedford Automile got its start when Lynn L. Horton and his brother, Ralph E. Horton, opened the first car dealership in Bedford in the early 1920s. The original dealership sold Ford Motor Company cars, but quickly expanded to offer other makes of cars, such as Chevrolet, De Soto and Plymouth.

Eventually the Horton brothers went into business with another brother, William Horton, and friends Floyd Mosher and Thomas Lally. This resulted in the dealerships eventually being renamed to Mosher-Lally, and later as Lally Chevrolet. Lally Chevrolet still operates in Bedford on the Bedford Automile under the name of Tim Lally Chevrolet. (Tim Lally is a descendant of Thomas Lally.)

As the success of the car sales in Bedford increased, other car dealers opened new dealerships around the original car dealership, expanding along Broadway Avenue. This grouping of car dealerships eventually formed the Bedford Automile Dealers Association. This group not only works to represent its interests in the Bedford area, but also donates heavily to the surrounding community, schools and city to help maintain the integrity of the surrounding area.

In April 2013, the city of Bedford established monuments to the historic Automile.
