= The Taylor Companies =

American furniture company

- Type: Private
- Industry: Furniture
- Founded: 1816
- Headquarters: Bedford, Ohio, USA
- Key people: Jeff Baldassari (President) Brett Meals (Executive VP); Bob Schroeter (Treasurer) Nancy Paladino (National Sales Manager)
- Website: www.thetaylorcompanies.com

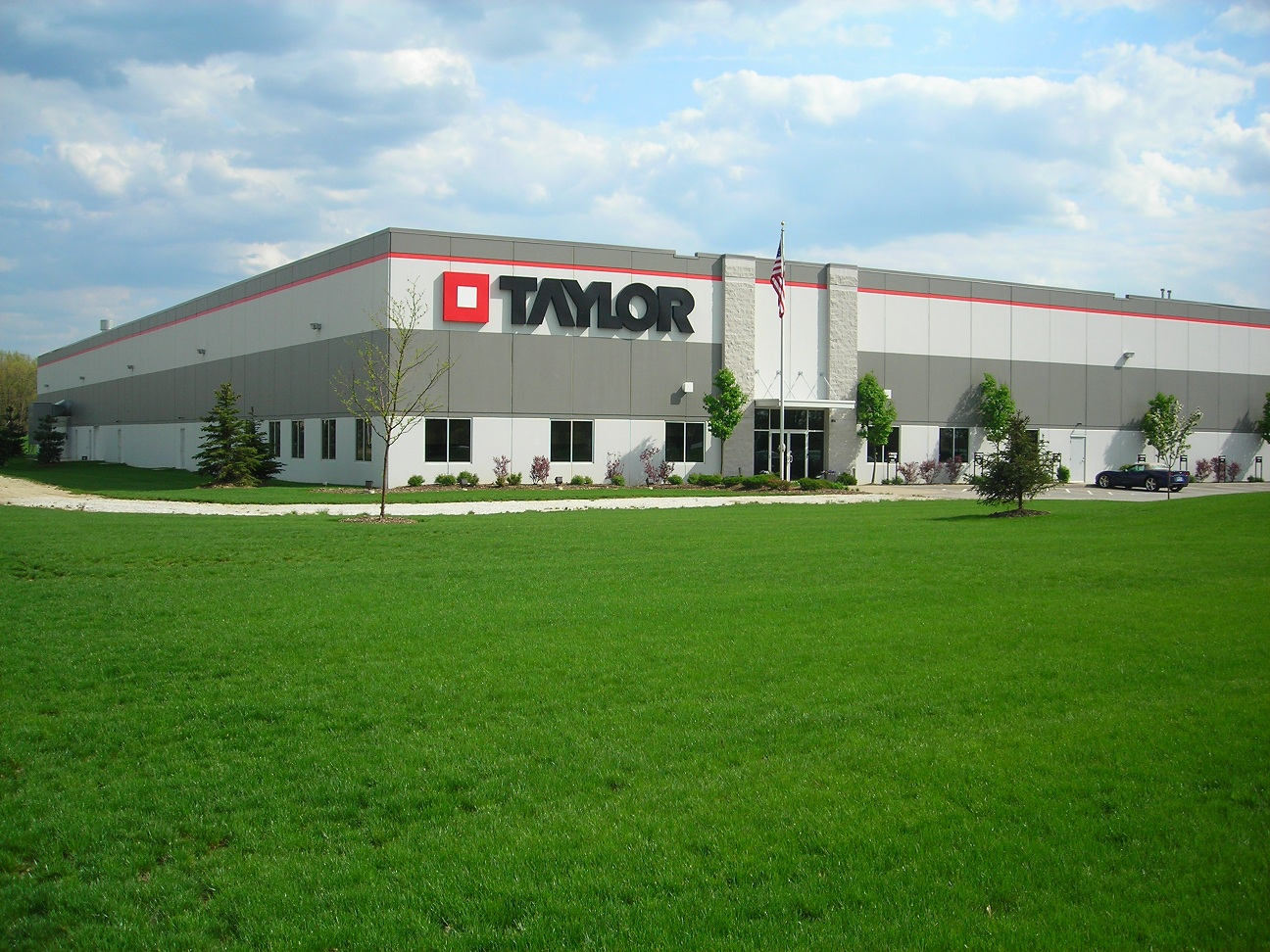
Bedford Ohio Factory

The Taylor Companies, consisting of The Taylor Chair Company and The Taylor Desk Company, was an American manufacturer of upholstered wood office seating and wood casegoods. Taylor’s primary manufacturing plant and headquarters were located in Bedford, Ohio. It also had a second manufacturing plant located in Lynwood, California. The company was often touted as being the oldest privately held furniture manufacturer in the United States.

== History ==
Established in 1816 by Benjamin Fitch, The Taylor Companies had been privately held for seven generations and was recognized as the oldest manufacturing company in existence in the Western Reserve.

Benjamin Fitch started making split-bottom chairs in 1816 at his cabin at the corner of what is now Libby and Warrensville Center Roads in Bedford Township, now part of Maple Heights, Ohio.

One of the young men working for Benjamin Fitch was William O. Taylor. In 1841 he married Mr. Fitch's daughter, Harriet. By the mid-1840s William Taylor had taken over active management of the company, although Benjamin Fitch remained involved in applying his skills to production methods and tools.

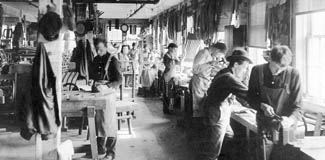
The Taylor Companies Factory 1899

In 1871 W. O. Taylor's son, Vincent A. Taylor took over the active management of the company, and the name was changed to W. O. Taylor and Son. In 1876 the International Exhibition in Philadelphia awarded the company a prize for outstanding products and methods.

In 1885, it was incorporated as The Taylor Chair Company. As an Ohio Corporation it began with capitalization of $100,000 and an issue of 1,000 shares of stock. Following incorporation the company grew in volume of sales and in the breadth of its product lines. By 1907 there were 102 different designs of chairs being produced. In 1913 the company began the design of office furniture. When World War I broke out the company supplied furniture for military offices throughout the country.

The company survived the depression, and during the World War II years of 1941-1945 it became extremely busy filling government orders In 1945 the pent-up civilian demand for furniture produced high levels of business. By 1947 the company employed the largest number of people in its history.

The 1950s and 1960s saw a continued expansion of product lines, including chairs, sofas, and tables available to professional interior designers. The alertness of The Taylor Chair Co. in responding to changing market conditions has been a major factor in the success of the company.

On June 8, 2012 the Taylor Company announced that the company would close. The last day of regular operation was June 15, 2012. Parts of the plant remained open for a few weeks to complete orders. Equipment used for production is being auctioned in August 2012. No plans for the building have been announced. Company archives and artifacts were divided between the Bedford Historical Society and the Western Reserve Historical Society.

== Sustainability ==
Taylor initiated various sustainable manufacturing practices. In July 2006, Taylor moved to a new factory on a remediated 50 acre brownfield that had been abandoned since 1987. The former brownfield is now called Tinker's Creek Commerce Park and it is where Taylor operates its Bedford, Ohio factory and headquarters.

By investing in energy efficient equipment, having an energy audit and implementing better practices in the factory, Taylor’s aggregate consumption of natural gas, electricity and water was reduced by 59% at the new Bedford, Ohio manufacturing plant. 90% of the manufacturing waste that was generated at the Bedford, Ohio factory was diverted away from local landfills through recycling, upcycling and composting. At the Lynwood, California factory, 60% of the manufacturing waste was diverted from local landfills. Taylor reduced its costs by $20,000 through waste reduction and $80,000 through energy conservation efforts.

In April, 2010, Taylor became the first furniture manufacturer member of The Climate Registry.

Taylor has received numerous national and regional recognition of its sustainability efforts:

- North American Sustainable Enterprise People’s Choice Award, 2010
- Crain’s Cleveland Business Emerald Award, 2010
- North American Sustainable Enterprise of the Year, 2011
- SJF Institute Green Jobs Award, 2011
- Pillar Award, Sustainable Business Practices, 2011

The Taylor Cos., a nearly 200-year-old company that bills itself as the oldest furniture manufacturer in the United States, announced that it plans to go out of business. August 8, 2012 On September 18, 2012 the Gasser Chair Co. of Youngstown, Ohio announced that it had acquired the intellectual property of Taylor Chair Co. This will allow Gasser Chair, a manufacturer of commercial seating for the entertainment and hospitality industries, to expand into office seating. The agreement also allows Gasser Chair to use the Taylor brand name and customer list.
