= Benjamin Franklin Fitch =

Founder of the Taylor Chair Company

Benjamin Franklin Fitch was the founder of the Taylor Chair Company, which is one of the longest running, single family owned companies in the US. He originally started a furniture workshop in Bedford, Ohio that developed a unique technique for building chairs that involved using both dried and green wood. The combination of the two types of wood resulted in a chair that would lock together as it cured without any glue or fasteners. As word of his technique spread, demand for his chairs increased and he hired apprentices to help him build his unique and sturdy chairs. One of these apprentices then courted and won the heart of his daughter and they eventually married. He then founded Taylor Chair Company with his son-in-law, William O. Taylor.
