= Cuyahoga County, Ohio =

County in Ohio, United States

Cuyahoga County
- County
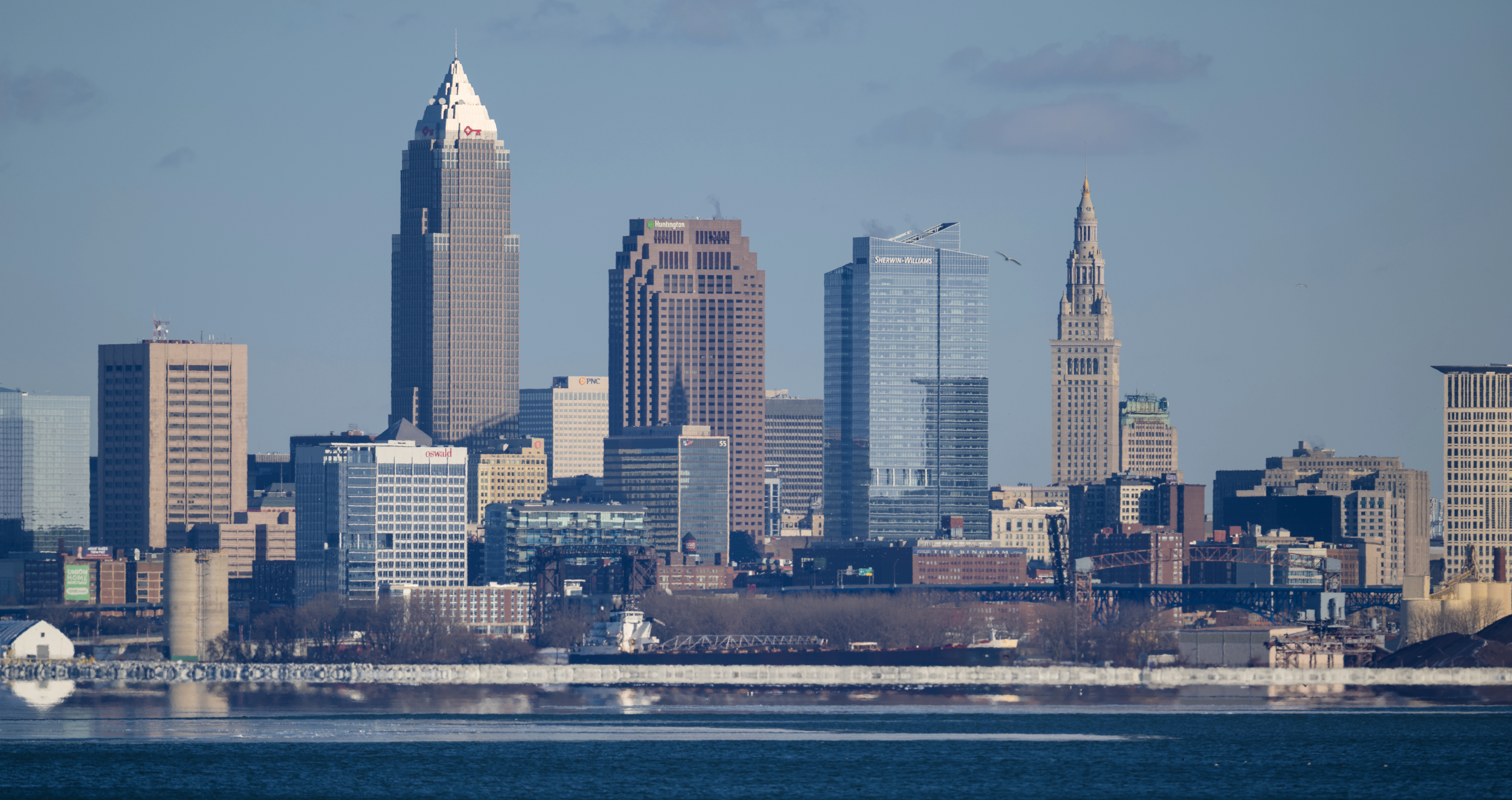
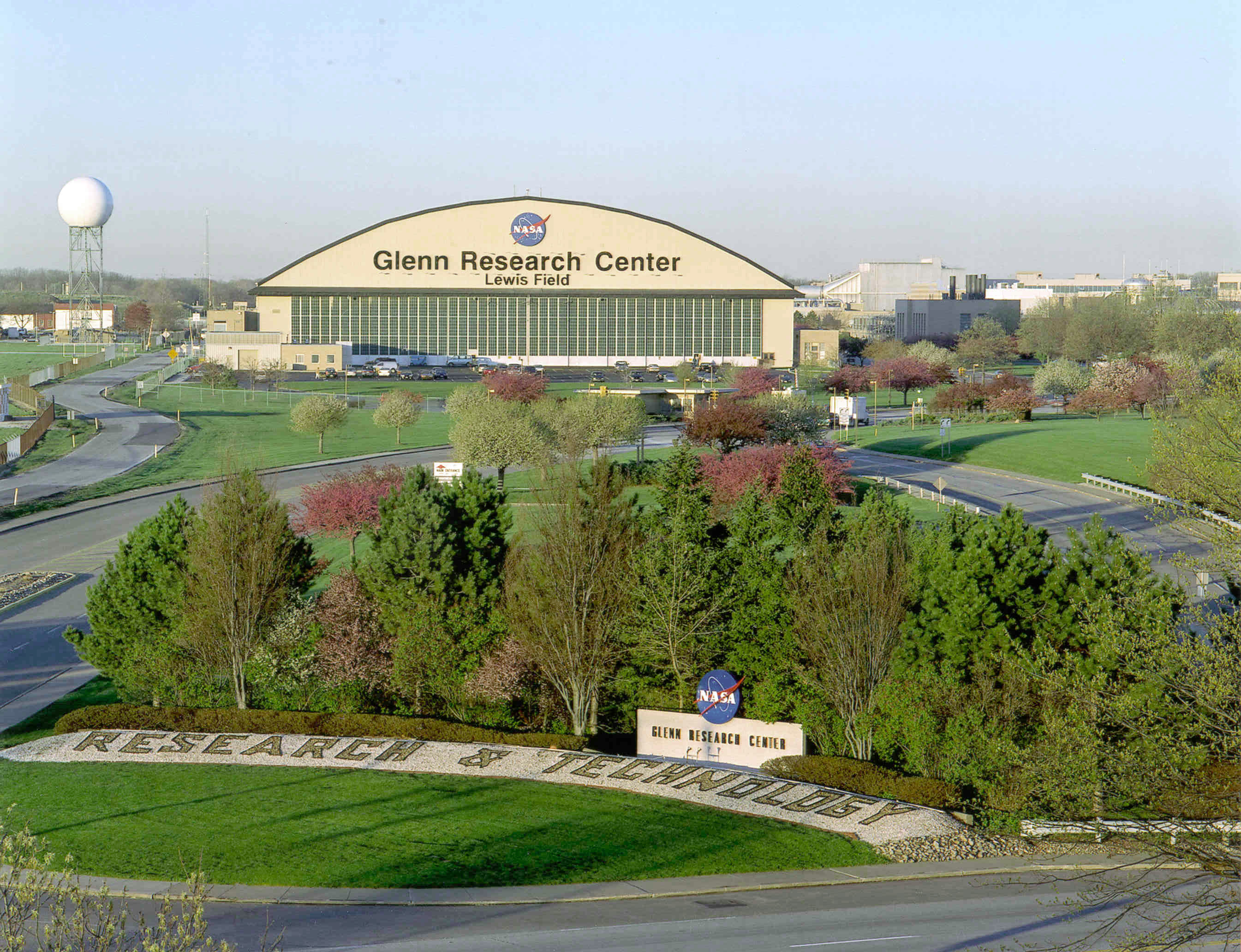
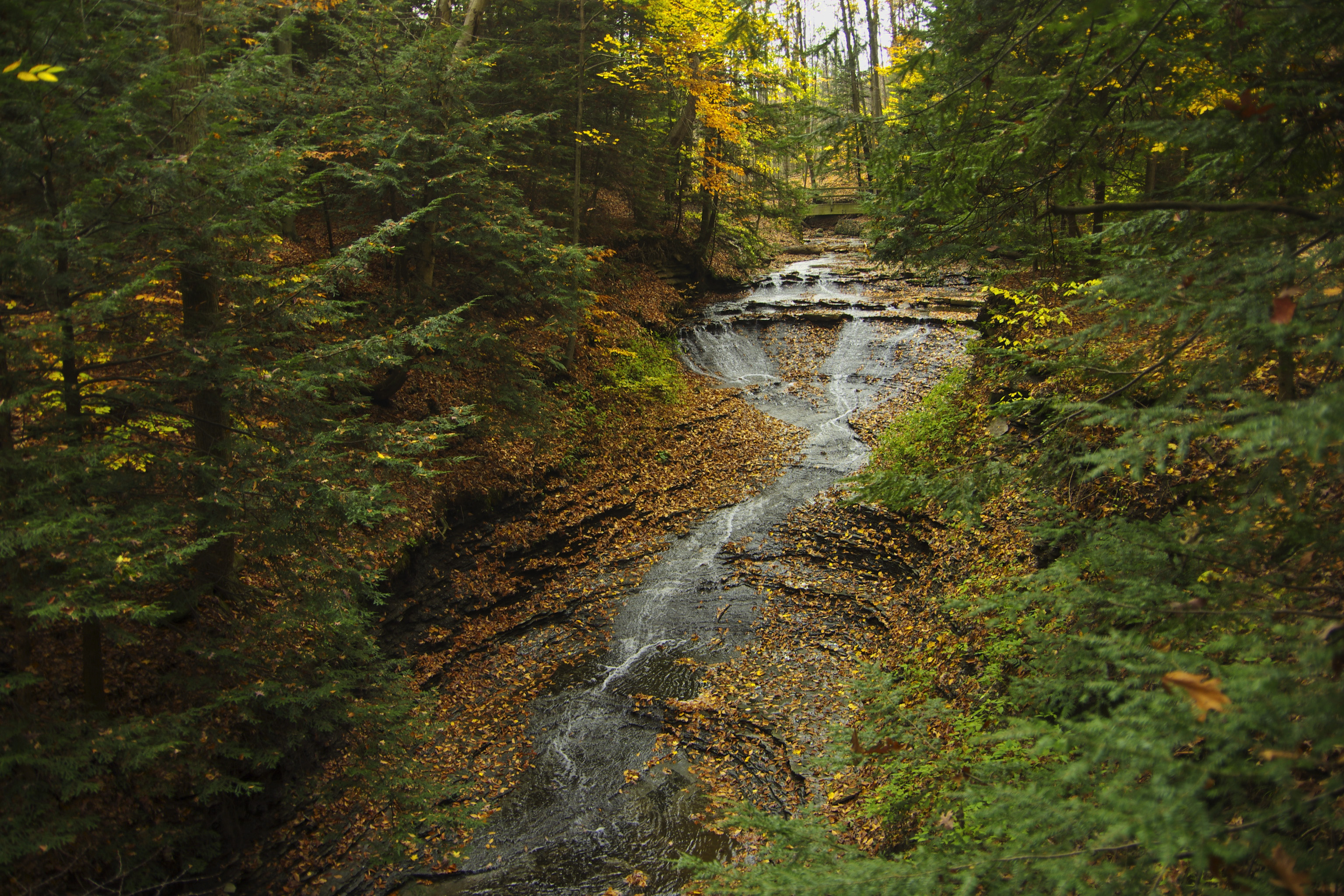
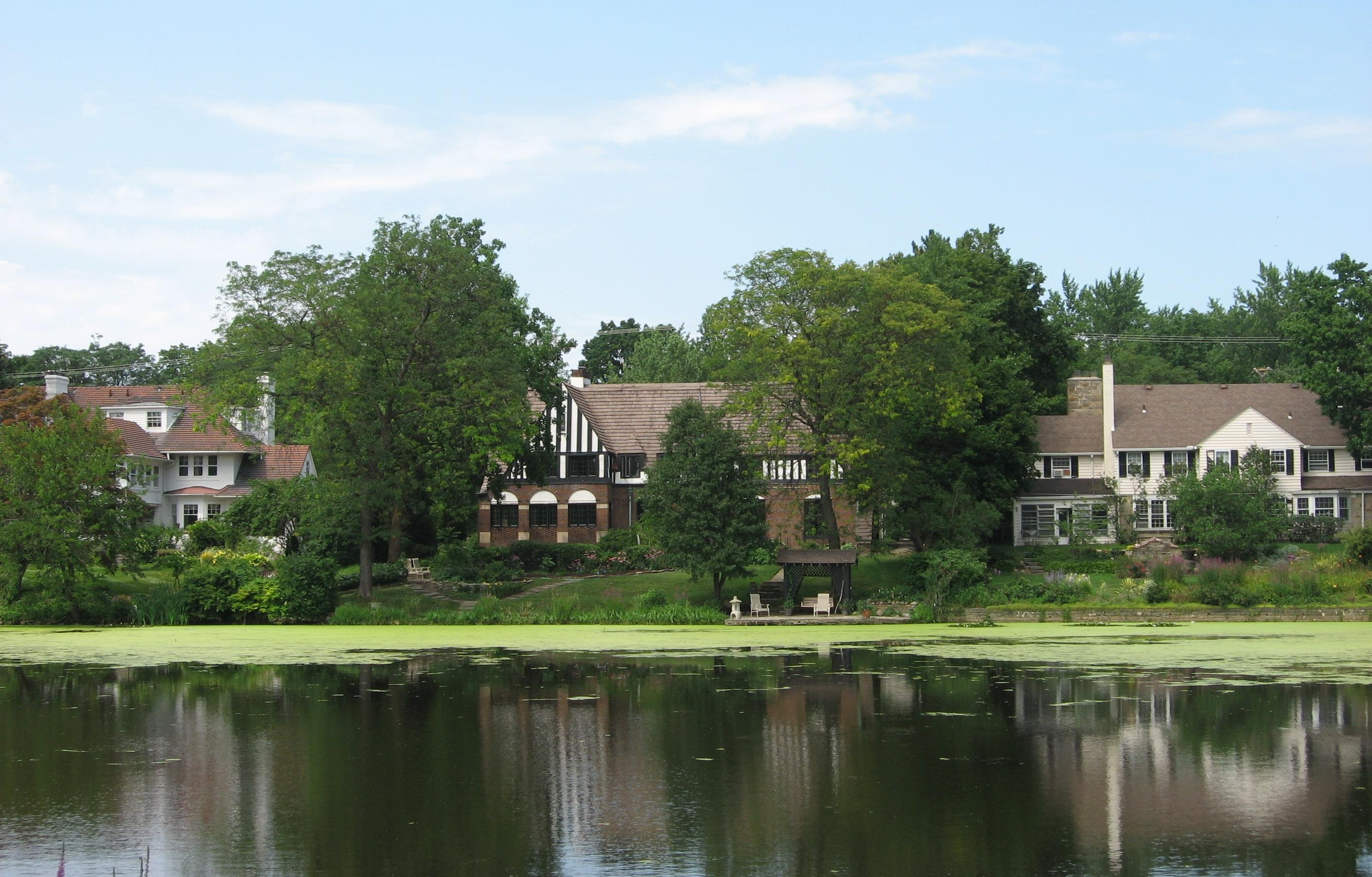
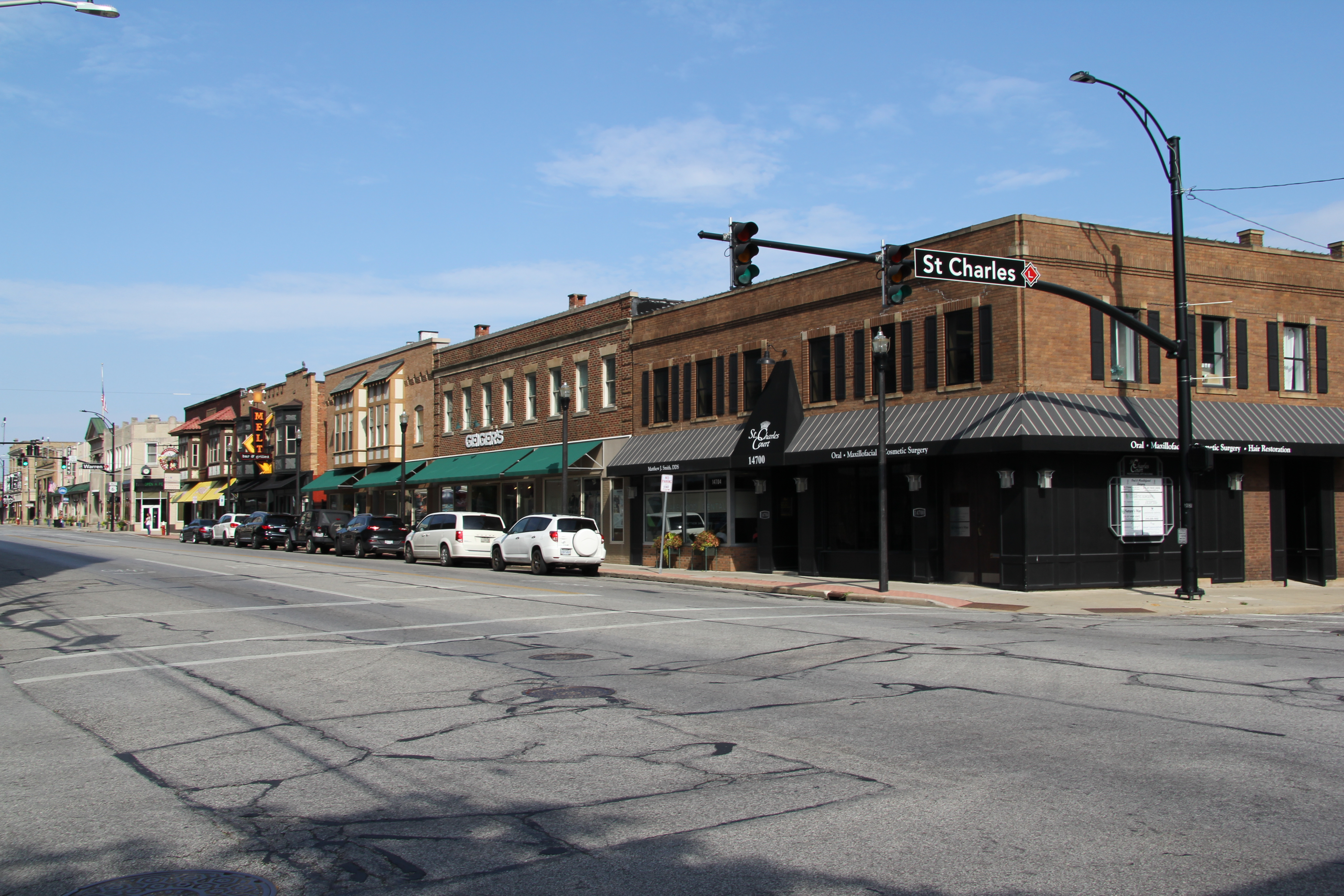
- Downtown Cleveland Glenn Research Center Cuyahoga Valley National Park Shaker Village Historic District Lakewood Downtown Historic District

- Flag Seal
- Etymology: Cuyahoga River
- Map of Cuyahoga County within Ohio
- Coordinates: 41°32′24″N 81°39′36″W
- Country: United States
- State: Ohio
- Region: Northeast Ohio
- Founded: May 1, 1810
- Named for: Cuyahoga River
- County seat: Cleveland

Government
  - County Executive: Chris Ronayne (D)

Area
  - Total: 1,246 sq mi (3,230 km^{2})
  - Land: 457 sq mi (1,180 km^{2})
  - Water: 788 sq mi (2,040 km^{2})
- Elevation: 653 ft (199 m)

Population (2020)
  - Total: 1,264,817
  - Estimate (2025): 1,232,925 ▼
  - Density: 2,770/sq mi (1,070/km^{2})

GDP
  - Total: $104.292 billion (2022)
- Time zone: UTC−5 (EST)
  - Summer (DST): UTC−4 (EDT)
- Area code: 216
- Congressional districts: 7th, 11th
- Largest city: Cleveland
- Website: cuyahogacounty.gov

Cuyahoga County (/ˌkaɪ.əˈhɒɡə/ KY-ə-HOG-ə or /ˌkaɪ.əˈhoʊɡə/ KY-ə-HOH-gə, see Cuyahoga River § Pronunciation) is a large urban county in the U.S. state of Ohio. The county seat and most populous city is Cleveland. As of the 2025 census estimates, its population was 1,232,925, making it the second-most populous county in the state and the most populous in Northeast Ohio.

Cuyahoga County is situated on the southern shore of Lake Erie, across the U.S.–Canada maritime border. The county is bisected by the Cuyahoga River, after which it was named. "Cuyahoga" is an Iroquoian word meaning "crooked river". It is the core county of the Cleveland, OH Metropolitan Statistical Area and Cleveland–Akron–Canton, OH Combined Statistical Area.

== History ==
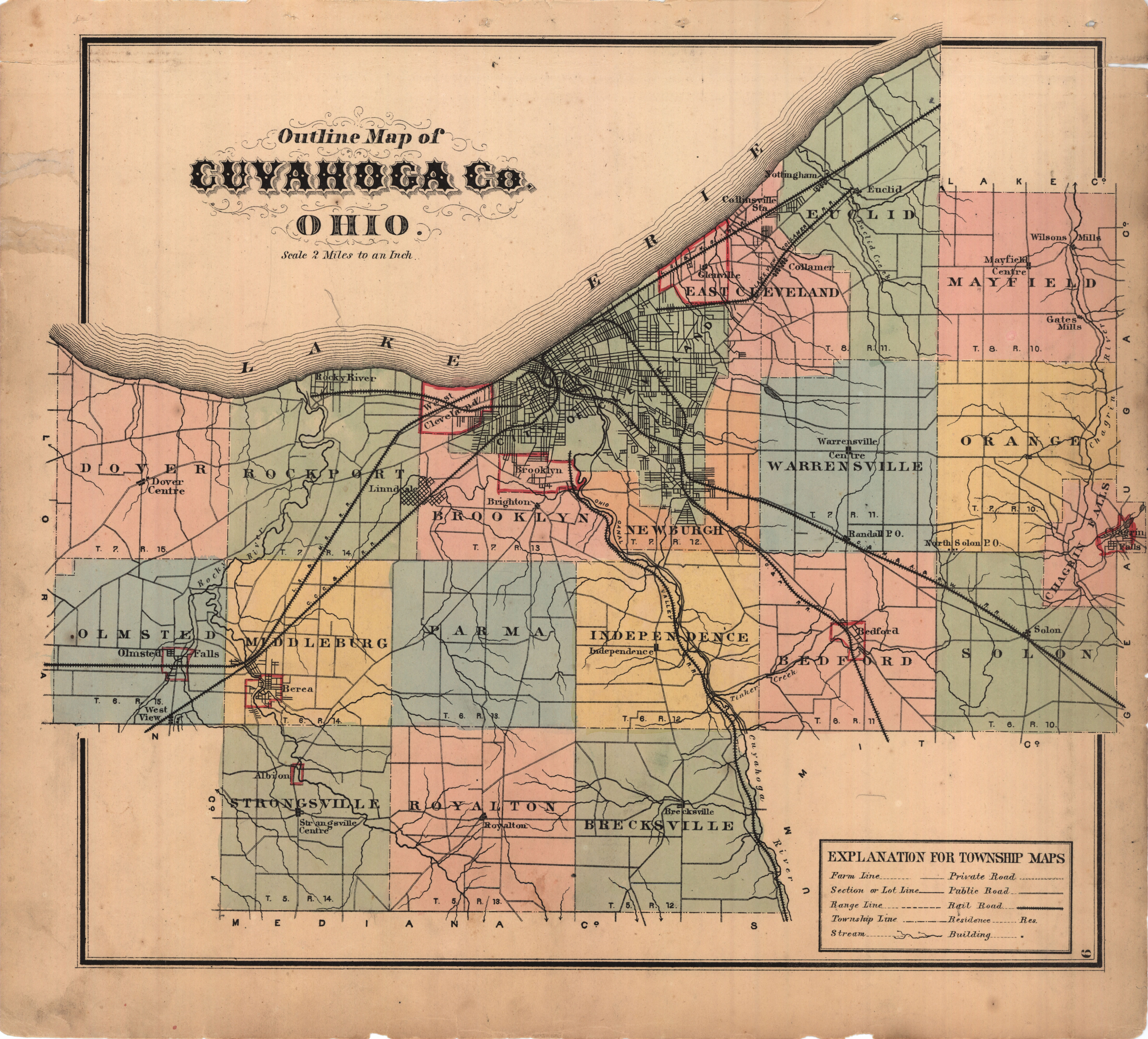
Cuyahoga County in 1874

The land that became Cuyahoga County was previously part of the French colony of Canada (New France), which was ceded in 1763 to Great Britain and renamed Province of Quebec. In the early 1790s, the land became part of the Connecticut Western Reserve in the Northwest Territory, and it was purchased by the Connecticut Land Company in 1795. Cleveland was established one year later by General Moses Cleaveland near the mouth of the Cuyahoga River.

Cuyahoga County was created on June 7, 1807, and organized on May 1, 1810. Cleveland (then also known as "Cleaveland") was selected as the county seat in 1809. The county was later reduced in size by the creation of Huron, Lake, and Lorain counties.

In 1831, future U.S. President James A. Garfield was born in what was at the time Cuyahoga County's Orange Township.

== Geography ==
According to the United States Census Bureau, the county has an area of 1,246 sq mi (3,230 km^{2}), of which 457 sq mi (1,180 km^{2}) are land and 788 sq mi (2,040 km^{2}) (63%) are water. It is the second-largest county in Ohio by area. A portion of Cuyahoga Valley National Park is in the county's southeastern section.

=== Adjacent counties ===
- Lake County (northeast)
- Geauga County (east)
- Summit County (southeast)
- Medina County (southwest)
- Lorain County (west)
- Portage County (southeast)

== Demographics ==
Historical population
Census	Pop.	Note	%±
1810	1,459		—
1820	6,328		333.7%
1830	10,373		63.9%
1840	26,506		155.5%
1850	48,099		81.5%
1860	78,033		62.2%
1870	132,010		69.2%
1880	196,943		49.2%
1890	309,970		57.4%
1900	439,120		41.7%
1910	637,425		45.2%
1920	943,495		48.0%
1930	1,201,455		27.3%
1940	1,217,250		1.3%
1950	1,389,532		14.2%
1960	1,647,895		18.6%
1970	1,721,300		4.5%
1980	1,498,400		−12.9%
1990	1,412,140		−5.8%
2000	1,393,978		−1.3%
2010	1,280,122		−8.2%
2020	1,264,817		−1.2%
2025 (est.)	1,232,925	▼	−2.5%
U.S. Decennial Census; 1790–1960 1900–1990; 1990–2000 2010–2020

=== 2020 census ===
Cuyahoga County, Ohio – Racial and ethnic composition Note: the US Census treats Hispanic/Latino as an ethnic category. This table excludes Latinos from the racial categories and assigns them to a separate category. Hispanics/Latinos may be of any race.
Race / ethnicity (NH = Non-Hispanic)	Pop 1980	Pop 1990	Pop 2000	Pop 2010	Pop 2020	% 1980	% 1990	% 2000	% 2010	% 2020
White alone (NH)	1,118,289	1,011,481	918,577	785,977	718,753	74.63%	71.63%	65.90%	61.40%	56.83%
Black or African American alone (NH)	338,591	348,153	379,397	374,968	365,169	22.60%	24.65%	27.22%	29.29%	28.87%
Native American or Alaska Native alone (NH)	1,644	2,311	2,156	2,018	1,827	0.11%	0.16%	0.15%	0.16%	0.14%
Asian alone (NH)	11,470	17,736	25,019	32,615	43,739	0.77%	1.26%	1.79%	2.55%	3.46%
Native Hawaiian or Pacific Islander alone (NH)	x	x	257	217	249	x	x	0.02%	0.02%	0.02%
Other race alone (NH)	4,378	1,012	1,900	1,842	5,745	0.29%	0.07%	0.14%	0.14%	0.45%
Mixed race or Multiracial (NH)	x	x	19,594	21,215	46,008	x	x	1.41%	1.66%	3.64%
Hispanic or Latino (any race)	24,028	31,447	47,078	61,270	83,327	1.60%	2.23%	3.38%	4.79%	6.59%
Total	1,498,400	1,412,140	1,393,978	1,280,122	1,264,817	100.00%	100.00%	100.00%	100.00%	100.00%

Racial / Ethnic Profile of places in Cuyahoga County, Ohio (2020 Census)
Following is a table of cities, villages, and census designated places in Cuyahoga County, Ohio. Data for the United States (with and without Puerto Rico), the state of Ohio, and Cuyahoga County itself have been included for comparison purposes.
The majority racial/ethnic group is coded per the key below. Communities that extend into and adjacent county or counties are delineated with a ‡ followed by an accompanying explanatory note. The full population of each community has been tabulated including the population in adjacent counties.

Majority minority with no dominant group
Majority White
Majority Black
Majority Hispanic
Majority Asian

Racial and ethnic composition of places in Cuyahoga County (2020 Census) (NH = Non-Hispanic) Note: the US Census treats Hispanic/Latino as an ethnic category. This table excludes Latinos from the racial categories and assigns them to a separate category. Hispanics/Latinos may be of any race.
Place	Designation	Total Population	White alone (NH)	%	Black or African American alone (NH)	%	Native American or Alaska Native alone (NH)	%	Asian alone (NH)	%	Pacific Islander alone (NH)	%	Other race alone (NH)	%	Mixed race or Multiracial (NH)	%	Hispanic or Latino (any race)	%
United States of America (50 states and D.C.)	x	331,449,281	191,697,647	57.84%	39,940,338	12.05%	2,251,699	0.68%	19,618,719	5.92%	622,018	0.19%	1,689,833	0.51%	13,548,983	4.09%	62,080,044	18.73%
United States of America (50 states, D.C., and Puerto Rico)	x	334,735,155	191,722,195	57.28%	39,944,624	11.93%	2,252,011	0.67%	19,621,465	5.86%	622,109	0.19%	1,692,341	0.51%	13,551,323	4.05%	65,329,087	19.52%
Ohio	State	11,799,448	8,954,135	75.89%	1,457,180	12.35%	18,949	0.16%	296,604	2.51%	4,493	0.04%	45,217	0.38%	501,562	4.25%	521,308	4.42%
Cuyahoga County	County	1,264,817	718,753	56.83%	365,169	28.87%	1,827	0.14%	43,739	3.46%	249	0.02%	5,745	0.45%	46,008	3.64%	83,327	6.59%
Bay Village	City	16,163	15,019	92.92%	95	0.59%	2	0.01%	162	1.00%	1	0.01%	26	0.16%	422	2.61%	436	2.70%
Beachwood	City	14,040	9,515	67.77%	1,954	13.92%	4	0.03%	1,644	11.71%	0	0.00%	118	0.84%	451	3.21%	354	2.52%
Bedford	City	13,149	5,252	39.94%	6,835	51.98%	25	0.19%	103	0.78%	7	0.05%	40	0.30%	491	3.73%	396	3.01%
Bedford Heights	City	11,020	1,473	13.37%	8,479	76.94%	16	0.15%	104	0.94%	4	0.04%	41	0.37%	401	3.64%	502	4.56%
Berea	City	18,545	15,258	82.28%	1,210	6.52%	32	0.17%	406	2.19%	5	0.03%	51	0.28%	841	4.53%	742	4.00%
Brecksville	City	13,635	12,283	90.08%	103	0.76%	6	0.04%	480	3.52%	3	0.02%	28	0.21%	461	3.38%	271	1.99%
Broadview Heights	City	19,936	16,987	85.21%	522	2.62%	10	0.05%	1,035	5.19%	0	0.00%	63	0.32%	694	3.48%	625	3.14%
Brook Park	City	18,595	15,332	82.45%	772	4.15%	13	0.07%	447	2.40%	1	0.01%	55	0.30%	827	4.45%	1,148	6.17%
Brooklyn	City	11,359	7,378	64.95%	988	8.70%	23	0.20%	651	5.73%	0	0.00%	58	0.51%	467	4.11%	1,794	15.79%
Cleveland	City	372,624	119,547	32.08%	176,813	47.45%	844	0.23%	10,390	2.79%	100	0.03%	1,970	0.53%	14,261	3.83%	48,699	13.07%
Cleveland Heights	City	45,312	20,677	45.63%	18,534	40.90%	55	0.12%	2,274	5.02%	5	0.01%	357	0.79%	1,874	4.14%	1,536	3.39%
East Cleveland	City	13,792	630	4.57%	12,314	89.28%	31	0.22%	44	0.32%	5	0.04%	64	0.46%	474	3.44%	230	1.67%
Euclid	City	49,692	14,649	29.48%	31,562	63.52%	80	0.16%	314	0.63%	6	0.01%	297	0.60%	1,736	3.49%	1,048	2.11%
Fairview Park	City	17,291	15,138	87.55%	446	2.58%	14	0.08%	280	1.62%	5	0.03%	74	0.43%	603	3.49%	731	4.23%
Garfield Heights	City	29,781	10,502	35.26%	16,618	55.80%	37	0.12%	266	0.89%	3	0.01%	88	0.30%	1,097	3.68%	1,170	3.93%
Highland Heights	City	8,719	7,489	85.89%	265	3.04%	4	0.05%	598	6.86%	0	0.00%	9	0.10%	188	2.16%	166	1.90%
Independence	City	7,584	6,902	91.01%	58	0.76%	7	0.09%	217	2.86%	0	0.00%	22	0.29%	228	3.01%	150	1.98%
Lakewood	City	50,942	42,164	82.77%	2,674	5.25%	57	0.11%	1,219	2.39%	16	0.03%	192	0.38%	2,136	4.19%	2,484	4.88%
Lyndhurst	City	14,050	10,676	75.99%	2,061	14.67%	8	0.06%	430	3.06%	1	0.01%	72	0.51%	454	3.23%	348	2.48%
Maple Heights	City	23,701	4,322	18.24%	17,679	74.59%	48	0.20%	137	0.58%	5	0.02%	134	0.57%	723	3.05%	653	2.76%
Mayfield Heights	City	20,351	13,674	67.19%	3,406	16.74%	30	0.15%	1,760	8.65%	1	0.00%	72	0.35%	765	3.76%	643	3.16%
Middleburg Heights	City	16,004	13,031	81.42%	348	2.17%	29	0.18%	1,410	8.81%	6	0.04%	39	0.24%	452	2.82%	689	4.31%
North Olmsted	City	32,442	27,577	85.00%	950	2.93%	32	0.10%	903	2.78%	8	0.02%	116	0.36%	1,228	3.79%	1,628	5.02%
North Royalton	City	31,322	27,552	87.96%	544	1.74%	31	0.10%	1,332	4.25%	0	0.00%	67	0.21%	947	3.02%	849	2.71%
Olmsted Falls	City	8,582	7,631	88.92%	159	1.85%	4	0.05%	119	1.39%	0	0.00%	30	0.35%	326	3.80%	313	3.65%
Parma	City	81,146	66,785	82.30%	3,271	4.03%	140	0.17%	2,027	2.50%	8	0.01%	257	0.32%	723	0.89%	5,564	6.86%
Parma Heights	City	20,863	16,646	79.79%	1,183	5.67%	22	0.11%	815	3.91%	2	0.01%	74	0.35%	775	3.71%	1,346	6.45%
Pepper Pike	City	6,796	5,237	77.06%	377	5.55%	9	0.13%	629	9.26%	0	0.00%	57	0.84%	289	4.25%	198	2.91%
Richmond Heights	City	10,801	3,474	32.16%	6,361	58.89%	7	0.06%	343	3.18%	1	0.01%	47	0.44%	310	2.87%	258	2.39%
Rocky River	City	21,755	19,546	89.85%	278	1.28%	18	0.08%	511	2.35%	8	0.04%	76	0.35%	612	2.81%	706	3.25%
Seven Hills	City	11,720	10,457	89.22%	227	1.94%	6	0.05%	356	3.04%	1	0.01%	39	0.33%	306	2.61%	328	2.80%
Shaker Heights	City	29,439	15,672	53.24%	9,915	33.68%	18	0.06%	1,288	4.38%	7	0.02%	186	0.63%	1,412	4.80%	941	3.20%
Solon	City	24,262	15,865	65.39%	2,819	11.62%	24	0.10%	4,001	16.49%	3	0.01%	86	0.35%	871	3.59%	593	2.44%
South Euclid	City	21,883	8,185	37.40%	11,596	52.99%	18	0.08%	378	1.73%	5	0.02%	152	0.69%	819	3.74%	730	3.34%
Strongsville	City	46,491	39,100	84.10%	1,187	2.55%	50	0.11%	2,908	6.25%	14	0.03%	134	0.29%	1,453	3.13%	1,645	3.54%
University Heights	City	13,914	9,638	69.27%	2,953	21.22%	6	0.04%	314	2.26%	4	0.03%	127	0.91%	412	2.96%	460	3.31%
Warrensville Heights	City	13,789	421	3.05%	12,559	91.08%	25	0.18%	75	0.54%	3	0.02%	79	0.57%	342	2.48%	285	2.07%
Westlake	City	34,228	29,020	84.78%	773	2.26%	16	0.05%	1,963	5.74%	9	0.03%	146	0.43%	1,144	3.34%	1,157	3.38%
Bentleyville	Village	897	810	90.30%	7	0.78%	0	0.00%	21	2.34%	0	0.00%	2	0.22%	28	3.12%	29	3.23%
Bratenahl	Village	1,430	1,048	73.29%	225	15.73%	0	0.00%	55	3.85%	0	0.00%	21	1.47%	45	3.15%	36	2.52%
Brooklyn Heights	Village	1,519	1,351	88.94%	25	1.65%	4	0.26%	36	2.37%	0	0.00%	1	0.07%	37	2.44%	65	4.28%
Chagrin Falls	Village	4,188	3,888	92.84%	52	1.24%	5	0.12%	22	0.53%	0	0.00%	12	0.29%	110	2.63%	99	2.36%
Cuyahoga Heights	Village	573	486	84.82%	8	1.40%	0	0.00%	15	2.62%	0	0.00%	0	0.00%	37	6.46%	27	4.71%
Gates Mills	Village	2,264	1,998	88.25%	52	2.30%	2	0.09%	84	3.71%	0	0.00%	8	0.35%	63	2.78%	57	2.52%
Glenwillow	Village	994	437	43.96%	330	33.20%	0	0.00%	178	17.91%	0	0.00%	6	0.60%	32	3.22%	11	1.11%
Highland Hills	Village	662	73	11.03%	561	84.74%	0	0.00%	1	0.15%	0	0.00%	3	0.45%	10	1.51%	14	2.11%
Hunting Valley ‡	Village	763	668	87.55%	5	0.66%	0	0.00%	27	3.54%	0	0.00%	3	0.39%	20	2.62%	40	5.24%
Linndale	Village	108	72	66.67%	12	11.11%	0	0.00%	0	0.00%	0	0.00%	4	3.70%	0	0.00%	20	18.52%
Mayfield	Village	3,356	2,865	85.37%	181	5.39%	1	0.03%	115	3.43%	0	0.00%	17	0.51%	99	2.95%	78	2.32%
Moreland Hills	Village	3,466	2,968	85.63%	120	3.46%	1	0.03%	149	4.30%	0	0.00%	5	0.14%	129	3.72%	94	2.71%
Newburgh Heights	Village	1,862	1,249	67.08%	338	18.15%	2	0.11%	5	0.27%	0	0.00%	22	1.18%	92	4.94%	154	8.27%
North Randall	Village	954	73	7.65%	812	85.12%	2	0.21%	9	0.94%	0	0.00%	5	0.52%	58	6.08%	31	3.25%
Oakwood	Village	3,572	1,042	29.17%	2,272	63.61%	6	0.17%	18	0.50%	0	0.00%	26	0.73%	131	3.67%	77	2.16%
Orange	Village	3,421	2,557	74.74%	382	11.17%	0	0.00%	265	7.75%	0	0.00%	8	0.23%	143	4.18%	66	1.93%
Valley View	Village	1,897	1,773	93.46%	8	0.42%	0	0.00%	24	1.27%	1	0.05%	9	0.47%	50	2.64%	32	1.69%
Walton Hills	Village	2,033	1,731	85.15%	204	10.03%	0	0.00%	17	0.84%	0	0.00%	4	0.20%	52	2.56%	25	1.23%
Woodmere	Village	641	158	24.65%	384	59.91%	0	0.00%	28	4.37%	0	0.00%	4	0.62%	40	6.24%	27	4.21%

As of the 2020 census, there were 1,264,817 people and 555,988 households residing in the county, along with 309,691 families. The population density was 2,766.4 inhabitants per square mile (1,068.1/km^{2}).

The median age was 40.5 years. 20.2% of residents were under the age of 18, 5.3% were under 5 years of age, and 18.9% of residents were 65 years of age or older. For every 100 females there were 91.6 males, and for every 100 females age 18 and over there were 88.7 males age 18 and over.

The racial makeup of the county was 58.2% White, 29.3% Black or African American, 0.2% American Indian and Alaska Native, 3.5% Asian, <0.1% Native Hawaiian and Pacific Islander, 2.8% from some other race, and 5.9% from two or more races. Hispanic or Latino residents of any race comprised 6.6% of the population.

99.4% of residents lived in urban areas, while 0.6% lived in rural areas.

Of those households, 24.6% had children under the age of 18 living in them. Of all households, 34.4% were married-couple households, 22.9% were households with a male householder and no spouse or partner present, and 35.8% were households with a female householder and no spouse or partner present. About 37.4% of all households were made up of individuals and 14.3% had someone living alone who was 65 years of age or older.

There were 615,825 housing units, of which 9.7% were vacant. Among occupied housing units, 57.5% were owner-occupied and 42.5% were renter-occupied. The homeowner vacancy rate was 1.5% and the rental vacancy rate was 8.8%.

=== 2010 census ===
Largest ancestries (2010)	Percent
German	17.4%
Irish	13.0%
Italian	9.2%
Polish	8.6%
English	6.3%
Slovak	3.3%

As of the 2010 census, there were 1,280,122 people, 571,457 households, and 319,996 families were residing in the county. The population density was 2,800.0 people/mi^{2} (1,081.1 people/km^{2}). The 621,763 housing units averaged 1,346 units per square mile (520 units/km^{2}). The racial makeup of the county was 63.6% White, 29.7% African American, 0.2% Native American, 2.6% Asian (0.9% Indian, 0.7% Chinese, 0.3% Filipino, 0.2% Korean, 0.2% Vietnamese, 0.1% Japanese), 1.8% from other races, and 2.1% from two or more races. About 4.8% of the population were Hispanics or Latinos of any race (3.1% Puerto Rican, 0.7% Mexican, 0.1% Dominican, 0.1% Guatemalan). Further, 16.5% were of German, 12.8% Irish, 8.8% Italian, 8.1% Polish, 5.9% English, 3.7% Slovak, and 3.1% Hungarian heritage.

Sizable numbers of Russians (1.7%), French, (1.4%), Arabs (1.4%), Ukrainians (1.2%), and Greeks (0.7%) were residing in the county; as their first language, 88.4% spoke English, 3.7% Spanish, and 4.9% some other Indo-European language. In addition, 7.3% of the population were foreign-born (of which 44.4% were born in Europe, 36.3% in Asia, and 12.1% in Latin America).

Of the 571,457 households, 28.5% had children under 18 living with them, 42.4% were married couples living together, 15.7% had a female householder with no husband present, and 37.9% were not families. About 32.8% of all households consisted of single individuals, and 12.1% consisted of someone living alone who was 65 or older. The average household size was 2.39, and the average family size was 3.06.

The age distribution in the county was as follows: 25.0% under 18, 8.0% between 18 and 24, 29.3% between 25 and 44, 22.2% between 45 and 64, and 15.6% who were 65 or older. The median age was 37 years old. For every 100 females, there were 89.5 males. For every 100 females age 18 and over, there were 85.2 males.

The median income in the county was $43,603 for a household and $58,631 and for a family. The county's per capita income was $26,263. About 10.3% of families, 19.4% of those under age 18, and 9.3% of those age 65 or over, and 13.1% of the population as a whole was living below the poverty line.

== Government and politics ==
=== Government ===
The Cuyahoga County Council and Executive exercise direct government over unincorporated areas of Cuyahoga County. As of 2012, this consisted of two small areas: Chagrin Falls Township and Olmsted Township.

Cuyahoga County had long been led by a three-member Board of County Commissioners, which is the default form of county government in the state. In July 2008, Federal Bureau of Investigation agents began raiding the offices of Cuyahoga County Commissioners and those of a wide range of cities, towns, and villages across Cuyahoga County. The investigation revealed extensive bribery and corruption across the area, affecting hundreds of millions of dollars in county contracts and business. The investigation led to the arrest of county commissioner Jimmy Dimora; county auditor Frank Russo; MetroHealth vice president John J. Carroll; former Strongsville councilman Patrick Coyne; former Ohio District Courts of Appeals judge Anthony O. Calabrese III; former Cuyahoga County Court of Common Pleas judge Bridget McCafferty; Cuyahoga County Sheriff Gerald McFaul; former Cleveland City Council member Sabra Pierce Scott; Cuyahoga County Court of Common Pleas judge Steven Terry; and a wide range of attorneys, building inspectors, consultants, contractors, school district employees, and mid and low level county workers.

On November 3, 2009, county voters overwhelmingly approved the adoption of a new county charter, which replaced the three-commissioner form of county government with an elected county executive and county prosecutor, and an 11-member county council. Each council member represents a single geographic district, with no at-large districts. The elected offices of auditor, clerk of courts, coroner, engineer, recorder, sheriff, and treasurer were abolished. The county executive was given authority to appoint individuals to these offices, which became part of the executive branch of the county. Summit County is the only other Ohio county with this form of government. Since the conception of the new government system, Democrats have consistently controlled the executive and the county council.

=== Politics ===
2020 presidential election by township and city: Biden: 50–60% 60–70% 70–80% 80–90% 90–100% Trump: 40–50% 50–60% 60–70%

Like many major urban counties, Cuyahoga County is heavily Democratic. Given its New England heritage and diverse population, plus union and labor involvement, the county often provides the Democratic Party with the largest margins in Ohio. In the 19th century, the Western Reserve, which Cleveland is the economic center of "probably the most intensely antislavery section of the country." It last voted Republican at the presidential level in 1972, when Richard Nixon carried it with a plurality. The last Republican presidential candidate to win an absolute majority was Dwight D. Eisenhower in 1956. However, it has occasionally voted Republican in statewide landslides since then, such as for John Kasich in the 2014 gubernatorial election and for George Voinovich in the 2004 Senate election.

Democratic strength is concentrated in the City of Cleveland and suburbs in eastern Cuyahoga County, such as Shaker Heights and Solon.

Republican strength is concentrated in the southern Cuyahoga County suburbs, such as Strongsville and North Royalton. Suburbs in western Cuyahoga County, such as North Olmsted and Westlake tend to be more moderate.

Since around 2016, formerly Democratic working-class suburbs such as Middleburg Heights and Parma have trended to the GOP, while formerly GOP upscale suburbs such as Bay Village and Chagrin Falls have trended Democratic.

United States presidential election results for Cuyahoga County, Ohio
Year	Republican		Democratic		Third party(ies)	
Year	No.	%	No.	%	No.	%
1856	6,360	57.29%	4,446	40.05%	296	2.67%
1860	8,686	62.45%	4,814	34.61%	408	2.93%
1864	10,009	63.06%	5,864	36.94%	0	0.00%
1868	12,582	61.33%	7,933	38.67%	0	0.00%
1872	14,451	63.75%	8,033	35.44%	184	0.81%
1876	18,198	55.21%	14,425	43.76%	340	1.03%
1880	22,123	58.66%	15,130	40.12%	463	1.23%
1884	24,052	55.15%	18,764	43.02%	797	1.83%
1888	25,994	50.92%	23,949	46.92%	1,103	2.16%
1892	26,657	45.63%	29,543	50.58%	2,214	3.79%
1896	42,993	52.76%	37,542	46.07%	955	1.17%
1900	45,299	50.55%	42,440	47.36%	1,870	2.09%
1904	57,367	62.86%	24,202	26.52%	9,687	10.62%
1908	56,344	55.39%	39,954	39.27%	5,431	5.34%
1912	14,176	13.81%	43,610	42.49%	44,838	43.69%
1916	51,287	39.78%	71,553	55.50%	6,080	4.72%
1920	148,857	64.36%	70,518	30.49%	11,904	5.15%
1924	130,169	49.29%	24,000	9.09%	109,897	41.62%
1928	194,508	53.42%	166,188	45.64%	3,412	0.94%
1932	166,337	44.89%	185,731	50.12%	18,510	4.99%
1936	128,947	27.12%	311,117	65.44%	35,354	7.44%
1940	209,070	37.59%	347,118	62.41%	0	0.00%
1944	217,824	39.71%	330,659	60.29%	0	0.00%
1948	214,889	43.80%	257,958	52.58%	17,781	3.62%
1952	329,465	50.34%	324,962	49.66%	0	0.00%
1956	353,474	53.72%	304,558	46.28%	0	0.00%
1960	288,056	40.17%	429,030	59.83%	0	0.00%
1964	196,436	28.50%	492,911	71.50%	0	0.00%
1968	238,791	35.44%	363,540	53.95%	71,508	10.61%
1972	329,493	49.94%	317,670	48.15%	12,588	1.91%
1976	255,594	41.01%	349,186	56.03%	18,442	2.96%
1980	254,883	41.47%	307,448	50.02%	52,351	8.52%
1984	284,094	43.60%	362,626	55.65%	4,913	0.75%
1988	242,439	40.33%	353,401	58.79%	5,277	0.88%
1992	187,186	29.24%	337,548	52.72%	115,507	18.04%
1996	163,770	29.15%	341,357	60.75%	56,765	10.10%
2000	192,099	33.42%	359,913	62.62%	22,770	3.96%
2004	221,600	32.89%	448,503	66.57%	3,674	0.55%
2008	199,880	29.95%	458,422	68.70%	8,997	1.35%
2012	190,660	29.55%	447,273	69.32%	7,329	1.14%
2016	184,212	30.25%	398,276	65.41%	26,391	4.33%
2020	202,699	32.32%	416,176	66.36%	8,285	1.32%
2024	195,165	33.56%	376,385	64.72%	9,965	1.71%

United States Senate election results for Cuyahoga County, Ohio1
Year	Republican		Democratic		Third party(ies)	
Year	No.	%	No.	%	No.	%
2024	170,671	29.99%	384,042	67.49%	14,352	2.52%

== Education ==
=== Colleges and universities ===
Cuyahoga County is home to a number of higher-education institutions, including:

- Baldwin Wallace University (Berea)
- Bryant and Stratton College (Parma)
- Cleveland Bartending School (Cleveland Heights)
- Case Western Reserve University (Cleveland)
- Cleveland Institute of Art (Cleveland)
- Cleveland Institute of Music (Cleveland)
- Cleveland State University (Cleveland)
- Cuyahoga Community College (Cleveland, Highland Hills, Westlake, and Parma)
- DeVry University (Seven Hills)
- John Carroll University (University Heights)
- Kent State University College of Podiatric Medicine (Independence)
- Stautzenberger College (Brecksville)
- Ursuline College (Pepper Pike)

=== K-12 education ===
School districts include:

- Bay Village City School District
- Beachwood City School District
- Bedford City School District
- Berea City School District
- Brecksville-Broadview Heights City School District
- Brooklyn City School District
- Chagrin Falls Exempted Village School District
- Cleveland Municipal School District
- Cleveland Heights-University Heights City School District
- Cuyahoga Heights Local School District
- East Cleveland City School District
- Euclid City School District
- Fairview Park City School District
- Garfield Heights City School District
- Independence Local School District
- Lakewood City School District
- Maple Heights City School District
- Mayfield City School District
- North Olmsted City School District
- North Royalton City School District
- Olmsted Falls City School District
- Orange City School District
- Parma City School District
- Rocky River City School District
- Richmond Heights Local School District
- Shaker Heights City School District
- Solon City School District
- South Euclid-Lyndhurst City School District
- Strongsville City School District
- Warrensville Heights City School District
- Westlake City School District

== Health ==
In 2014, Cuyahoga County ranked 65 out of 88 counties in Ohio for health outcomes. This ranking was based on multiple factors, including: premature death (7,975 years per 100,000 population, of potential life lost), adults who reported having poor or fair health (15%), average number of poor physical-health days reported in a 30-day period (3.3), average number of poor mental-health days reported in a 30-day period (4.1), and the percentage of births with low birth-weight (10.4%). Among these factors, Cuyahoga did worse than the Ohio average in premature death, poor mental-health days, and low birth-weight. Possible explanations as for why Cuyahoga County is lower in health outcomes than the average Ohio county include behavioral factors, access to clinical care, social and economic factors, and environmental factors.

The leading causes of death and disability in Cuyahoga County are chronic diseases such as cancer, heart disease, obesity, and diabetes. The cancer mortality rate for Cuyahoga is 192.7 per 100,000 people, the mortality rate due to heart disease is 204.2 per 100,000 people, and the percentage of adult residents who are obese is 26.2%.

=== Community comparison of disparities ===
According to the Fox Chase Cancer Center, a health disparity can be defined as the existence of inequalities that prevent certain members of a population group from benefiting from the same health status as other groups. Cuyahoga County has many health disparities when comparing cities and demographics. The Hough neighborhood of Cleveland and the suburb of Lyndhurst can be compared to illustrate some of the disparities. The communities are both in Cuyahoga County and are less than 10 miles apart. They also have similar populations, but a different racial breakdown according to the 2010 census. The Hough neighborhood's population was 16,359 (96.1% Black or African American and 2.1% White American) and the Lyndhurst's population was 14,001 (6.4% Black or African American and 90.3% White American). A 24-year disparity was seen in life expectancy between the communities. Hough neighborhood residents have a life expectancy of 64 years and residents in Lyndhurst have a life expectancy of 88.5 years. The annual median income in the Hough neighborhood is $13,630 while it is $52,272 in Lyndhurst. Data collected from the Center for Community Solutions indicated from 1990 to 2001, the rate of heart disease for residents of the Hough neighborhood was around four times that of Lyndhurst residents. The Lyndhurst rate of accidental deaths was nine times higher than the Hough neighborhood.

=== Health facilities ===
- University Hospitals Ahuja Medical Center - Beachwood
- University Hospitals Bedford Medical Center - Bedford
- Cleveland Clinic - Cleveland
- Euclid Hospital - Euclid
- Fairview Hospital - Cleveland
- Hillcrest Hospital - Mayfield Heights
- Huron Hospital - East Cleveland
- University Hospitals Seidman Cancer Center - Cleveland
- Lakewood Hospital - Lakewood
- Lutheran Hospital - Cleveland
- University Hospitals MacDonald Women's Hospital - Cleveland
- Marymount Hospital - Garfield Heights
- MetroHealth Medical Center - Cleveland
- University Hospitals Parma Medical Center - Parma
- Rainbow Babies & Children's Hospital - Cleveland
- University Hospitals Richmond Medical Center - Richmond Heights
- South Pointe Hospital - Warrensville Heights
- Southwest General Health Center - Middleburg Heights
- St. Anne's Hospital, historical facility in Cleveland
- St. John Medical Center - Westlake
- St. Vincent Charity Medical Center - Cleveland
- University Hospitals Case Medical Center - University Circle, Cleveland
- Healthspan (formerly Kaiser Permanente of Northeast Ohio) - Bedford, Cleveland, Cleveland Heights, and Parma

== Transportation ==
=== Airports ===
Cuyahoga County is served by international, regional, and county airports, including:

- Cuyahoga County Airport
- Cleveland Hopkins International Airport (Cleveland)
- Cleveland Burke Lakefront Airport (Cleveland)

=== Major highways ===
- I-71
- I-77
- I-80 / Ohio Turnpike
- I-90
- I-271
- I-480
- I-480N
- I-490
- US 6
- US 20
- US 42
- US 322
- US 422
- SR 2
- SR 3
- SR 8
- SR 10
- SR 14
- SR 21
- SR 43
- SR 82
- SR 87
- SR 91
- SR 94
- SR 174
- SR 175
- SR 176
- SR 237
- SR 252
- SR 254
- SR 283
- SR 291

=== Rail ===
Cuyahoga County receives intercity passenger service by Amtrak by way of Lakefront Station in Cleveland, with destinations such as Chicago, New York, Boston, Washington, DC, and many more.

The Cuyahoga Valley Scenic Railroad offers scenic excursion service through the Cuyahoga Valley National Park by way of their Rockside Station in Independence.

Freight rail service is provided by Norfolk Southern, CSX Transportation, Wheeling and Lake Erie Railroad, Cleveland Commercial Railroad, and several other small companies. Norfolk Southern has the largest presence in the county, operating three different lines and several terminal yards.

=== Public transportation ===
The Greater Cleveland Regional Transit Authority, also known as RTA, provides public transportation to Cuyahoga County through a combination of conventional bus, rapid-transit bus, and rail transit services, as well as on-demand services. Several other county agencies also serve Cuyahoga County, mostly through downtown Cleveland.

Greyhound, Barons Bus Lines, and Megabus provide public transportation beyond Cuyahoga County to destinations across the United States.

== Recreation ==
The Cleveland Metroparks system serves Cuyahoga County. Its 16 reservations provide more than 21,000 acres (8,500 ha) of green space and recreational amenities. The county is home to part of Cuyahoga Valley National Park, which extends southward into Summit County.

== Culture ==
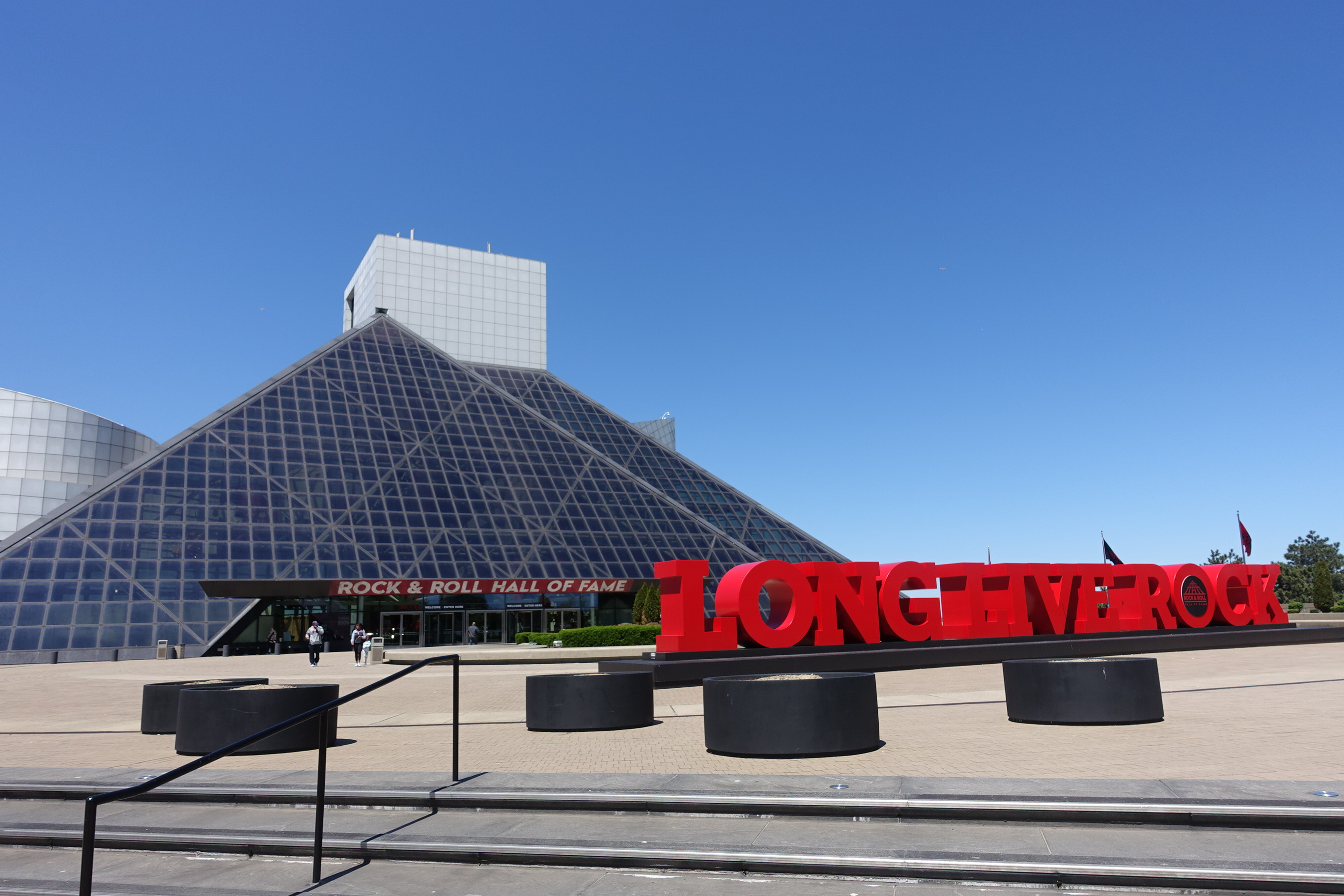
Rock and Roll Hall of Fame

=== Theaters ===
- Beck Center (Lakewood)
- Cabaret Dada (Cleveland)
- Cassidy Theater (Parma Heights)
- Cleveland Play House (Cleveland)
- Cleveland Public Theater (Cleveland)
- Dobama Theater (Cleveland Heights)
- East Cleveland Theater (East Cleveland)
- Huntington Playhouse (Bay Village)
- Karamu House (Cleveland)
- Near West Theatre (Cleveland)
- Playhouse Square Center (Cleveland)

=== Classical music ===
- Cleveland Orchestra performs in Severance Hall

=== Museums ===
- Cleveland Museum of Art
- Museum of Contemporary Art, Cleveland
- Rock and Roll Hall of Fame
- Cleveland Museum of Natural History
- Maltz Museum of Jewish Heritage, Beachwood
- Great Lakes Science Center, Cleveland
- International Women Air and Space Museum Cleveland

== Communities ==
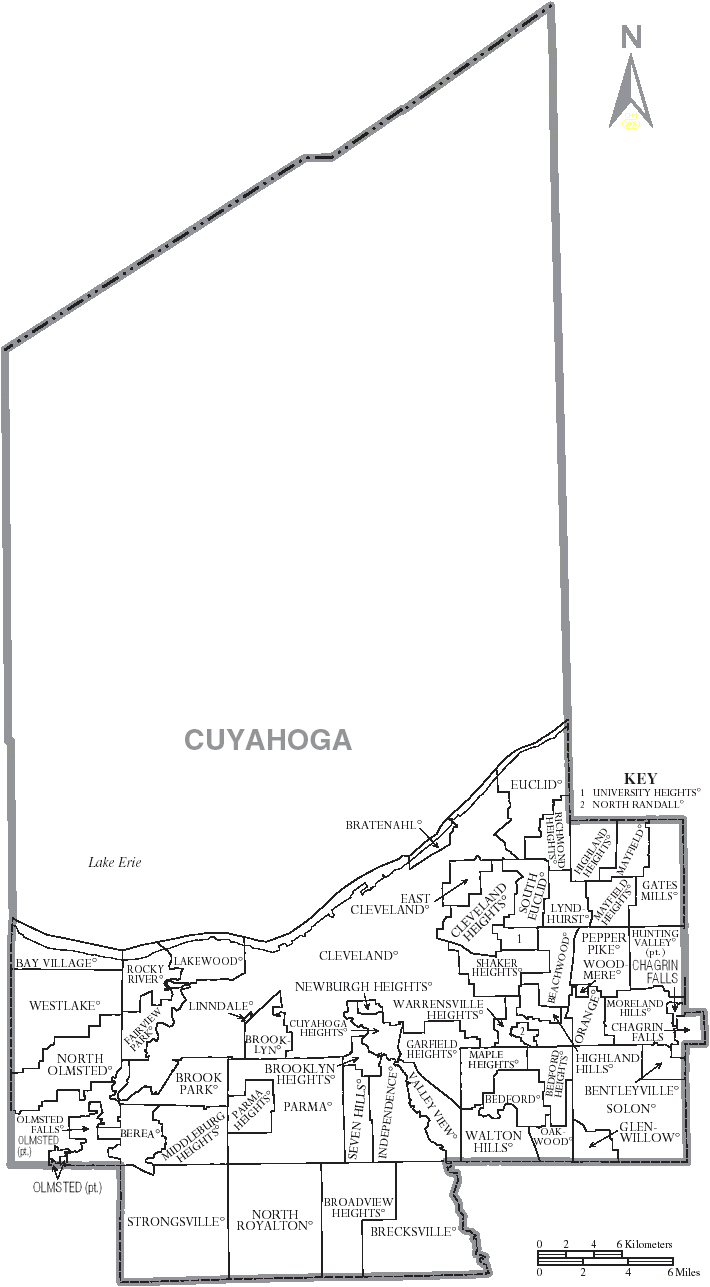
Map of Cuyahoga County, Ohio with Municipal and Township Labels

=== Cities ===
- Bay Village
- Beachwood
- Bedford
- Bedford Heights
- Berea
- Brecksville
- Broadview Heights
- Brook Park
- Brooklyn
- Cleveland (county seat)
- Cleveland Heights
- East Cleveland
- Euclid
- Fairview Park
- Garfield Heights
- Highland Heights
- Independence
- Lakewood
- Lyndhurst
- Maple Heights
- Mayfield Heights
- Middleburg Heights
- North Olmsted
- North Royalton
- Olmsted Falls
- Parma
- Parma Heights
- Pepper Pike
- Richmond Heights
- Rocky River
- Seven Hills
- Shaker Heights
- Solon
- South Euclid
- Strongsville
- University Heights
- Warrensville Heights
- Westlake

=== Villages ===
- Bentleyville
- Bratenahl
- Brooklyn Heights
- Chagrin Falls
- Cuyahoga Heights
- Gates Mills
- Glenwillow
- Highland Hills
- Hunting Valley
- Linndale
- Mayfield
- Moreland Hills
- Newburgh Heights
- North Randall
- Oakwood
- Orange
- Valley View
- Walton Hills
- Woodmere

=== Townships ===
- Chagrin Falls
- Olmsted
- Nineteen paper townships

== See also ==
- National Register of Historic Places listings in Cuyahoga County, Ohio
