= Bedford Heights, Ohio =

- City
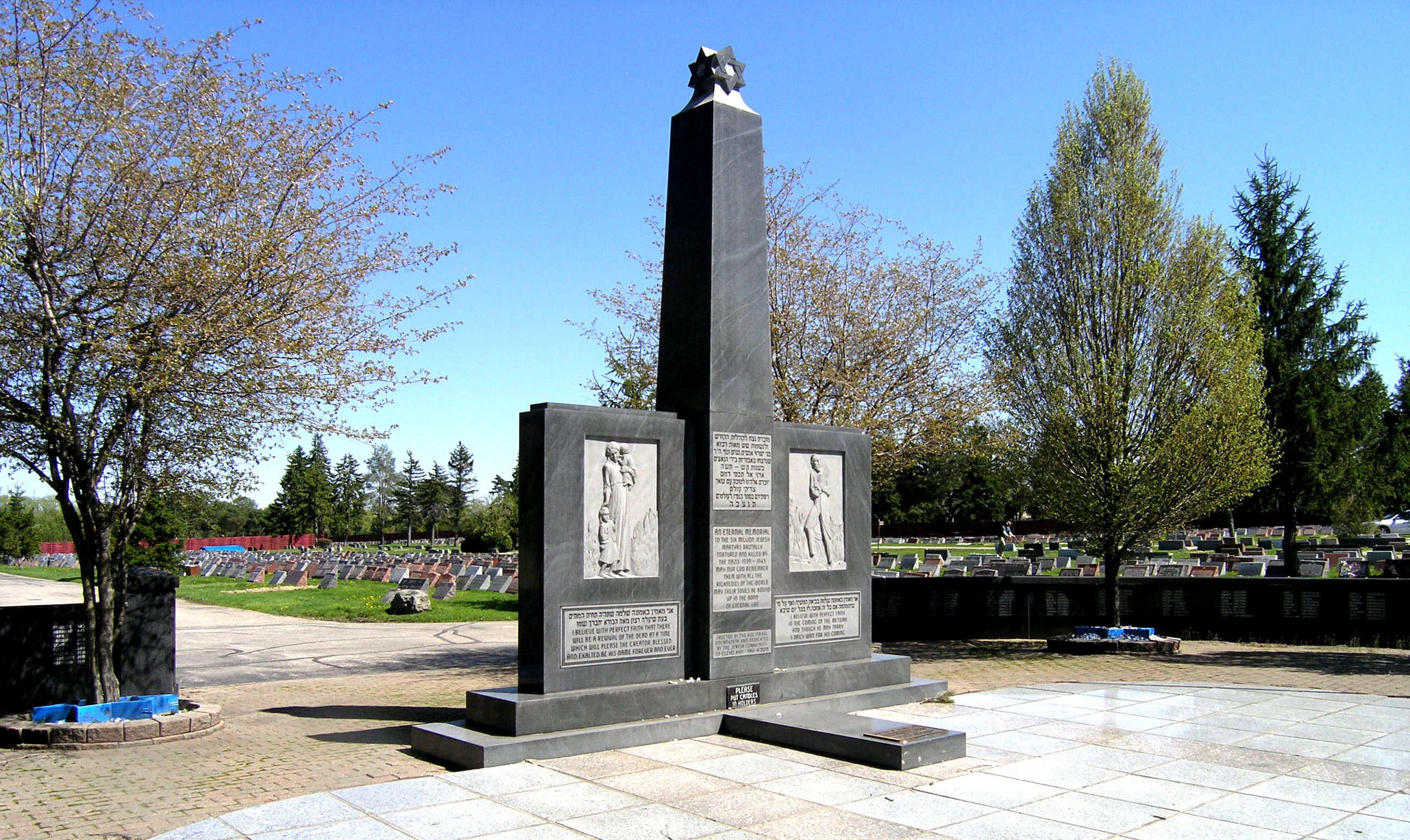
- Holocaust memorial
- Interactive map of Bedford Heights, Ohio
- Location within Ohio Location within the United States
- Coordinates: 41°23′40″N 81°28′50″W
- Country: United States
- State: Ohio
- County: Cuyahoga

Government
  - Mayor: Phil Stevens (D)

Area
  - Total: 4.56 sq mi (11.81 km^{2})
  - Land: 4.55 sq mi (11.78 km^{2})
  - Water: 0.012 sq mi (0.03 km^{2})
- Elevation: 1,037 ft (316 m)

Population (2020)
  - Total: 11,020
  - Estimate (2023): 10,721
  - Density: 2,423.5/sq mi (935.73/km^{2})
- Time zone: UTC-5 (Eastern (EST))
  - Summer (DST): UTC-4 (EDT)
- ZIP codes: 44128, 44146
- Area codes: 440
- FIPS code: 39-04920
- GNIS feature ID: 1085952
- Website: www.bedfordheights.gov

Bedford Heights is a city in Cuyahoga County, Ohio, United States. The population was 11,020 at the 2020 census. A suburb of Cleveland, it is a part of the Cleveland metropolitan area.

== History ==
Bedford Heights was founded on February 20, 1951. It was originally part of Bedford Township and the City of Bedford, Ohio. Robert E. Willeford and his wife, Georgina Willeford, worked diligently to help form the village of Bedford Heights. Robert E. Willeford went on to become the first mayor of Bedford Heights.

The Kol Israel Foundation Holocaust Memorial at Zion Memorial Park was dedicated on May 28, 1961. The monument was recognized as a US national memorial in 2022.

== Geography ==
According to the 2010 census, the city has a total area of 4.55 square miles (11.8 km^{2}), of which 4.54 square miles (11.8 km^{2}) (or 99.78%) is land and 0.01 square miles (0.026 km^{2}) (or 0.22%) is water.

== Demographics ==
Historical population
Census	Pop.	Note	%±
1960	5,275		—
1970	13,063		147.6%
1980	13,214		1.2%
1990	12,131		−8.2%
2000	11,375		−6.2%
2010	10,751		−5.5%
2020	11,020		2.5%
2023 (est.)	10,721		−2.7%

=== Racial and ethnic composition ===
Bedford Heights city, Ohio – Racial and ethnic composition Note: the US Census treats Hispanic/Latino as an ethnic category. This table excludes Latinos from the racial categories and assigns them to a separate category. Hispanics/Latinos may be of any race.
Race / Ethnicity (NH = Non-Hispanic)	Pop 2000	Pop 2010	Pop 2020	% 2000	% 2010	% 2020
White alone (NH)	3,103	1,916	1,473	27.28%	17.82%	13.37%
Black or African American alone (NH)	7,616	8,207	8,479	66.95%	76.34%	76.94%
Native American or Alaska Native alone (NH)	19	10	16	0.17%	0.09%	0.15%
Asian alone (NH)	215	123	104	1.89%	1.14%	0.94%
Native Hawaiian or Pacific Islander alone (NH)	1	0	4	0.01%	0.00%	0.04%
Other race alone (NH)	25	17	41	0.22%	0.16%	0.37%
Mixed race or Multiracial (NH)	214	196	401	1.88%	1.82%	3.64%
Hispanic or Latino (any race)	182	282	502	1.60%	2.62%	4.56%
Total	11,375	10,751	11,020	100.00%	100.00%	100.00%

=== 2020 census ===
As of the 2020 census, Bedford Heights had a population of 11,020. The median age was 44.4 years. 18.7% of residents were under the age of 18 and 22.1% of residents were 65 years of age or older. For every 100 females there were 81.6 males, and for every 100 females age 18 and over there were 77.5 males age 18 and over.

100.0% of residents lived in urban areas, while 0% lived in rural areas.

There were 5,435 households in Bedford Heights, of which 22.6% had children under the age of 18 living in them. Of all households, 23.5% were married-couple households, 23.6% were households with a male householder and no spouse or partner present, and 47.1% were households with a female householder and no spouse or partner present. About 43.2% of all households were made up of individuals and 16.4% had someone living alone who was 65 years of age or older.

There were 5,808 housing units, of which 6.4% were vacant. Among occupied housing units, 46.5% were owner-occupied and 53.5% were renter-occupied. The homeowner vacancy rate was 1.6% and the rental vacancy rate was 6.5%.

Racial composition as of the 2020 census
Race	Number	Percent
White	1,547	14.0%
Black or African American	8,532	77.4%
American Indian and Alaska Native	35	0.3%
Asian	107	1.0%
Native Hawaiian and Other Pacific Islander	5	<0.1%
Some other race	255	2.3%
Two or more races	539	4.9%
Hispanic or Latino (of any race)	502	4.6%

=== 2010 census ===
As of the census of 2010, there were 10,751 people, 5,111 households, and 2,844 families living in the city. The population density was 2,368.1 inhabitants per square mile (914.3/km^{2}). There were 5,750 housing units at an average density of 1,266.5 per square mile (489.0/km^{2}). The racial makeup of the city was 18.7% White, 76.9% African American, 0.1% Native American, 1.2% Asian, 1.1% from other races, and 2.1% from two or more races. Hispanic or Latino of any race were 2.6% of the population.

There were 5,111 households, of which 25.9% had children under the age of 18 living with them, 28.9% were married couples living together, 21.8% had a female householder with no husband present, 4.9% had a male householder with no wife present, and 44.4% were non-families. 39.4% of all households were made up of individuals, and 12% had someone living alone who was 65 years of age or older. The average household size was 2.09 and the average family size was 2.78.

The median age in the city was 43.3 years. 19.9% of residents were under the age of 18; 8.8% were between the ages of 18 and 24; 23.3% were from 25 to 44; 31.2% were from 45 to 64; and 16.8% were 65 years of age or older. The gender makeup of the city was 45.9% male and 54.1% female.

=== 2000 census ===
As of the census of 2000, there were 11,375 people, 5,119 households, and 3,004 families living in the city. The population density was 2,507.4 inhabitants per square mile (968.1/km^{2}). There were 5,577 housing units at an average density of 1,229.4 per square mile (474.7/km^{2}). The racial makeup of the city was 27.89% White, 67.42% African American, 0.20% Native American, 1.90% Asian, 0.01% Pacific Islander, 0.54% from other races, and 2.04% from two or more races. Hispanic or Latino of any race were 1.60% of the population. The second largest ancestry reported by residents of Bedford Heights, after African-American, is Italian.

There were 5,119 households, out of which 24.8% had children under the age of 18 living with them, 36.5% were married couples living together, 18.3% had a female householder with no husband present, and 41.3% were non-families. 36.0% of all households were made up of individuals, and 9.8% had someone living alone who was 65 years of age or older. The average household size was 2.21 and the average family size was 2.87.

In the city the population was spread out, with 21.9% under the age of 18, 8.6% from 18 to 24, 29.8% from 25 to 44, 26.5% from 45 to 64, and 13.2% who were 65 years of age or older. The median age was 39 years. For every 100 females, there were 86.9 males. For every 100 females age 18 and over, there were 83.7 males.

The median income for a household in the city was $37,861, and the median income for a family was $47,328. Males had a median income of $33,599 versus $29,167 for females. The per capita income for the city was $21,791. About 6.8% of families and 7.6% of the population were below the poverty line, including 13.2% of those under age 18 and 4.6% of those age 65 or over.

Bedford Heights has a prominent Jewish community and a 1961 erected Kol Israel Holocaust Memorial at the Zion Memorial Park Cemetery.
