= Oakwood, Cuyahoga County, Ohio =

Oakwood, Ohio
- Village
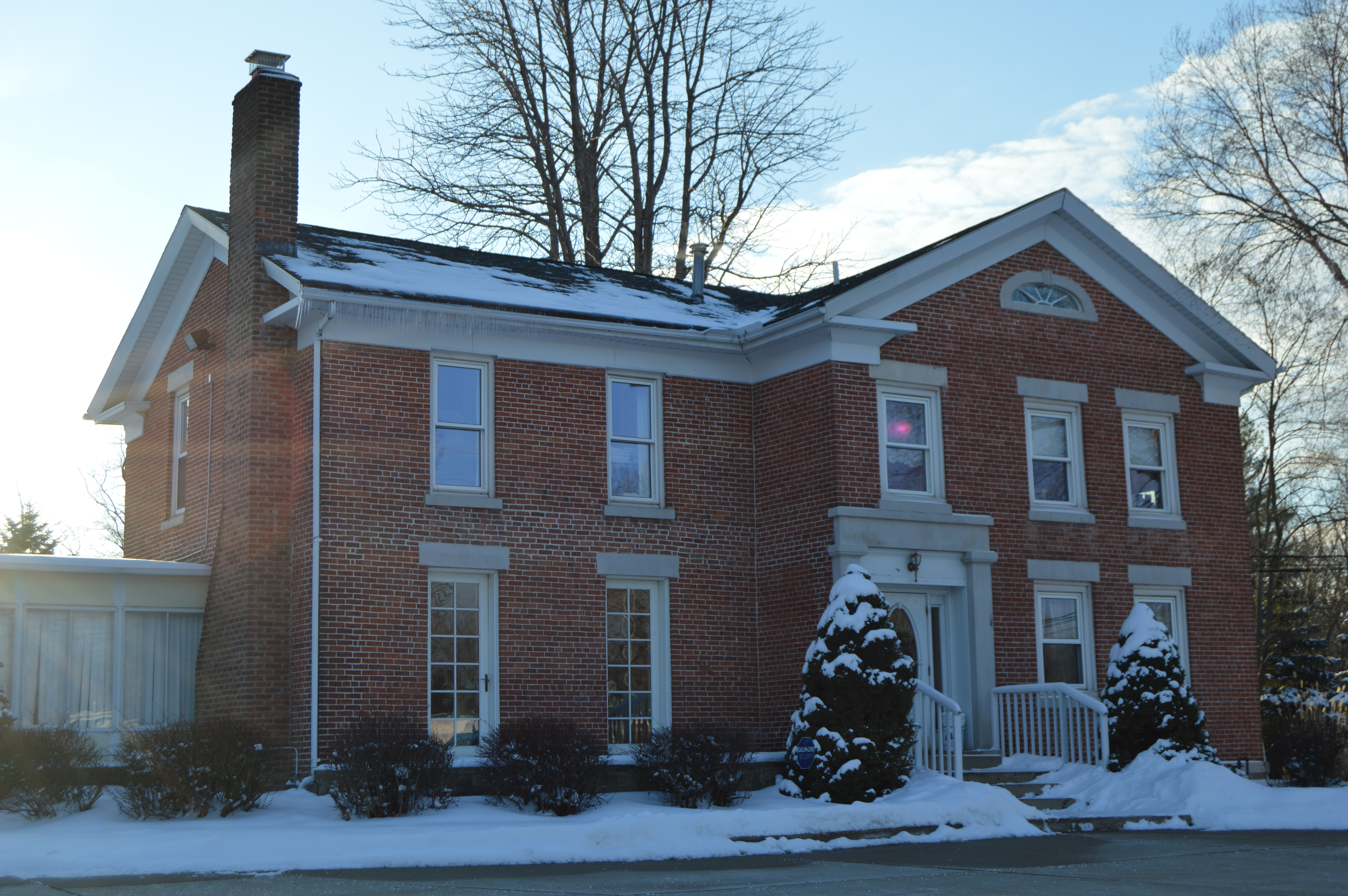
- Alonzo Drake House on Broadway
- Interactive map of Oakwood, Ohio
- Location within Ohio Location within the United States
- Coordinates: 41°22′1″N 81°30′14″W
- Country: United States
- State: Ohio
- County: Cuyahoga

Government
  - Mayor: Gary V. Gottschalk

Area
  - Total: 3.46 sq mi (8.95 km^{2})
  - Land: 3.45 sq mi (8.93 km^{2})
  - Water: 0.0077 sq mi (0.02 km^{2})
- Elevation: 1,047 ft (319 m)

Population (2020)
  - Total: 3,572
  - Density: 1,035.7/sq mi (399.87/km^{2})
- Time zone: UTC-5 (Eastern (EST))
  - Summer (DST): UTC-4 (EDT)
- FIPS code: 39-57750
- GNIS feature ID: 1084030
- Website: www.oakwoodvillageoh.com

Oakwood is a village in Cuyahoga County, Ohio, United States. The population was 3,572 at the 2020 census. An eastern suburb of Cleveland, it is a part of the Cleveland metropolitan area.

== Geography ==
Oakwood is located at 41°22′01″N 81°30′14″W. According to the United States Census Bureau, the village has a total area of 3.45 square miles (8.94 km^{2}), of which 3.44 square miles (8.91 km^{2}) is land and 0.01 square miles (0.03 km^{2}) is water.

== Demographics ==
Historical population
Census	Pop.	Note	%±
1960	3,283		—
1970	3,499		6.6%
1980	3,786		8.2%
1990	3,392		−10.4%
2000	3,667		8.1%
2010	3,667		0.0%
2020	3,572		−2.6%
U.S. Decennial Census

=== 2020 census ===
Oakwood village (Cuyahoga County), Ohio – Racial and ethnic composition Note: the US Census treats Hispanic/Latino as an ethnic category. This table excludes Latinos from the racial categories and assigns them to a separate category. Hispanics/Latinos may be of any race.
Race / Ethnicity (NH = Non-Hispanic)	Pop 2000	Pop 2010	Pop 2020	% 2000	% 2010	% 2020
White alone (NH)	1,473	1,081	1,042	40.17%	29.48%	29.17%
Black or African American alone (NH)	2,049	2,357	2,272	55.88%	64.28%	63.61%
Native American or Alaska Native alone (NH)	7	6	6	0.19%	0.16%	0.17%
Asian alone (NH)	13	27	18	0.35%	0.74%	0.50%
Native Hawaiian or Pacific Islander alone (NH)	1	2	0	0.03%	0.05%	0.00%
Other race alone (NH)	11	2	26	0.30%	0.05%	0.73%
Mixed race or Multiracial (NH)	62	108	131	1.69%	2.95%	3.67%
Hispanic or Latino (any race)	51	84	77	1.39%	2.29%	2.16%
Total	3,667	3,667	3,572	100.00%	100.00%	100.00%

=== 2010 census ===
As of the census of 2010, there were 3,667 people, 1,544 households, and 935 families living in the village. The population density was 1,066.0 inhabitants per square mile (411.6/km^{2}). There were 1,648 housing units at an average density of 479.1 per square mile (185.0/km^{2}). The racial makeup of the village was 30.7% White, 64.7% African American, 0.2% Native American, 0.7% Asian, 0.1% Pacific Islander, 0.2% from other races, and 3.4% from two or more races. Hispanic or Latino of any race were 2.3% of the population.

There were 1,544 households, of which 24.6% had children under the age of 18 living with them, 38.3% were married couples living together, 17.2% had a female householder with no husband present, 5.1% had a male householder with no wife present, and 39.4% were non-families. 35.0% of all households were made up of individuals, and 12.3% had someone living alone who was 65 years of age or older. The average household size was 2.28 and the average family size was 2.94.

The median age in the village was 46.7 years. 18.7% of residents were under the age of 18; 7.7% were between the ages of 18 and 24; 21.5% were from 25 to 44; 32.9% were from 45 to 64; and 19.3% were 65 years of age or older. The gender makeup of the village was 47.6% male and 52.4% female.

=== 2000 census ===
As of the census of 2000, there were 3,667 people, 1,416 households, and 877 families living in the village. The population density was 1,060.1 inhabitants per square mile (409.3/km^{2}). There were 1,480 housing units at an average density of 427.9 per square mile (165.2/km^{2}). The racial makeup of the village was 40.66% White, 56.23% African American, 0.19% Native American, 0.35% Asian, 0.03% Pacific Islander, 0.71% from other races, and 1.83% from two or more races. Hispanic or Latino of any race were 1.39% of the population.

There were 1,416 households, out of which 23.2% had children under the age of 18 living with them, 44.1% were married couples living together, 13.3% had a female householder with no husband present, and 38.0% were non-families. 33.6% of all households were made up of individuals, and 14.3% had someone living alone who was 65 years of age or older. The average household size was 2.43 and the average family size was 3.13.

In the village, the population was spread out, with 21.5% under the age of 18, 7.4% from 18 to 24, 23.5% from 25 to 44, 26.8% from 45 to 64, and 20.8% who were 65 years of age or older. The median age was 44 years. For every 100 females there were 87.8 males. For every 100 females age 18 and over, there were 86.0 males.

The median income for a household in the village was $39,404, and the median income for a family was $54,375. Males had a median income of $35,806 versus $30,735 for females. The per capita income for the village was $19,408. About 2.9% of families and 6.3% of the population were below the poverty line, including 3.0% of those under age 18 and 17.0% of those age 65 or over.

== Government ==
Oakwood was incorporated in 1951. In 1968 it enacted a home rule charter. The village is governed by a mayor-council form of government, with full-time services. Public safety services are provided by a full-time police department and a part-time fire department. The village also conducts its own mayor's court.

== Notable person ==
- Halle Berry, Academy Award-winning actress

== See also ==
- Oakwood, Montgomery County, Ohio
- Oakwood, Paulding County, Ohio
