= Walton Hills, Ohio =

- Village
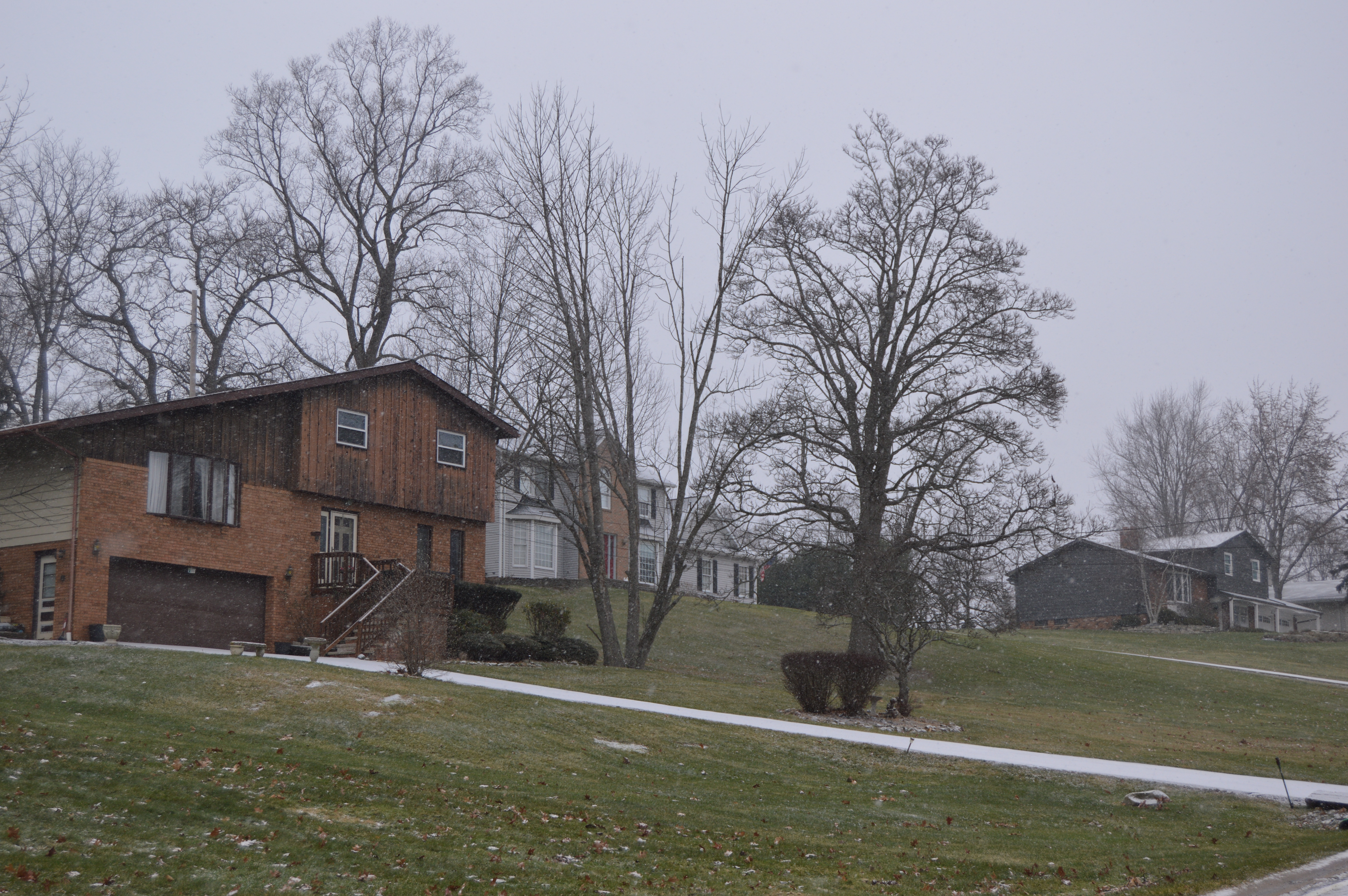
- Houses on Meadowpark Drive
- Interactive map of Walton Hills, Ohio
- Location within Ohio Location within the United States
- Coordinates: 41°21′51″N 81°33′16″W
- Country: United States
- State: Ohio
- County: Cuyahoga

Government
  - Type: Mayor-council
  - Mayor: Don Kolograf

Area
  - Total: 6.80 sq mi (17.61 km^{2})
  - Land: 6.75 sq mi (17.49 km^{2})
  - Water: 0.046 sq mi (0.12 km^{2})
- Elevation: 0 ft (0 m)

Population (2020)
  - Total: 2,033
  - Density: 301.1/sq mi (116.24/km^{2})
- census
- Time zone: UTC-4 (EST)
  - Summer (DST): UTC-4 (EDT)
- Zip code: 44146
- Area code: 440
- FIPS code
- GNIS feature ID
- Website: http://www.waltonhillsohio.gov/

Walton Hills is a village in Cuyahoga County, Ohio, United States. The population was 2,033 at the 2020 census. A suburb of Cleveland, it is a part of the Cleveland metropolitan area.

== Geography ==
Walton Hills is located at 41°21′51″N 81°33′16″W (41.364304, -81.554377).

According to the United States Census Bureau, the village has a total area of 6.81 square miles (17.64 km^{2}), of which 6.76 square miles (17.51 km^{2}) is land and 0.05 square miles (0.13 km^{2}) is water.

== Demographics ==
Historical population
Census	Pop.	Note	%±
1960	1,776		—
1970	2,508		41.2%
1980	2,199		−12.3%
1990	2,371		7.8%
2000	2,400		1.2%
2010	2,281		−5.0%
2020	2,033		−10.9%
U.S. Decennial Census

=== 2020 census ===
Walton Hills village, Ohio – Racial and ethnic composition Note: the US Census treats Hispanic/Latino as an ethnic category. This table excludes Latinos from the racial categories and assigns them to a separate category. Hispanics/Latinos may be of any race.
Race / Ethnicity (NH = Non-Hispanic)	Pop 2000	Pop 2010	Pop 2020	% 2000	% 2010	% 2020
White alone (NH)	2,296	2,057	1,731	95.67%	90.18%	85.15%
Black or African American alone (NH)	50	181	204	2.08%	7.94%	10.03%
Native American or Alaska Native alone (NH)	0	4	0	0.00%	0.18%	0.00%
Asian alone (NH)	12	7	17	0.50%	0.31%	0.84%
Native Hawaiian or Pacific Islander alone (NH)	0	0	0	0.00%	0.00%	0.00%
Other race alone (NH)	0	0	4	0.00%	0.00%	0.20%
Mixed race or Multiracial (NH)	20	15	52	0.83%	0.66%	2.56%
Hispanic or Latino (any race)	22	17	25	0.92%	0.75%	1.23%
Total	2,400	2,281	2,033	100.00%	100.00%	100.00%

=== 2010 census ===
As of the census of 2010, there were 2,281 people, 937 households, and 681 families living in the village. The population density was 337.4 inhabitants per square mile (130.3/km^{2}). There were 969 housing units at an average density of 143.3 per square mile (55.3/km^{2}). The racial makeup of the village was 90.7% White, 8.1% African American, 0.2% Native American, 0.3% Asian, and 0.7% from two or more races. Hispanic or Latino of any race were 0.7% of the population.

There were 937 households, of which 16.3% had children under the age of 18 living with them, 63.1% were married couples living together, 6.6% had a female householder with no husband present, 3.0% had a male householder with no wife present, and 27.3% were non-families. 23.5% of all households were made up of individuals, and 13.6% had someone living alone who was 65 years of age or older. The average household size was 2.27 and the average family size was 2.65.

The median age in the village was 55.4 years. 11.2% of residents were under the age of 18; 4.8% were between the ages of 18 and 24; 13.2% were from 25 to 44; 40.1% were from 45 to 64; and 30.8% were 65 years of age or older. The gender makeup of the village was 47.8% male and 52.2% female.

=== 2000 census ===
As of the census of 2000, there were 2,400 people, 903 households, and 720 families living in the village. The population density was 349.0 inhabitants per square mile (134.7/km^{2}). There were 919 housing units at an average density of 133.6 per square mile (51.6/km^{2}). The racial makeup of the village was 96.46% White, 2.08% African American, 0.50% Asian, 0.08% from other races, and 0.88% from two or more races. Hispanic or Latino of any race were 0.92% of the population.

There were 903 households, out of which 21.5% had children under the age of 18 living with them, 69.9% were married couples living together, 7.0% had a female householder with no husband present, and 20.2% were non-families. 16.8% of all households were made up of individuals, and 10.0% had someone living alone who was 65 years of age or older. The average household size was 2.53 and the average family size was 2.85.

In the village, the population was spread out, with 17.0% under the age of 18, 5.8% from 18 to 24, 21.7% from 25 to 44, 29.0% from 45 to 64, and 26.5% who were 65 years of age or older. The median age was 48 years. For every 100 females there were 91.5 males. For every 100 females age 18 and over, there were 88.3 males.

The median income for a household in the village was $62,321, and the median income for a family was $67,537. Males had a median income of $41,900 versus $27,841 for females. The per capita income for the village was $26,405. About 1.1% of families and 2.1% of the population were below the poverty line, including 2.6% of those under age 18 and 3.4% of those age 65 or over.
