= Dave Meggyesy =

American football player, author, and union organizer (born 1941)

No. 60
- Position: Linebacker

Personal information
- Born: November 1, 1941 (age 85); Cleveland, Ohio, U.S.
- Listed height: 6 ft 2 in (1.88 m)
- Listed weight: 220 lb (100 kg)

Career information
- High school: Solon (Solon, Ohio)
- College: Syracuse
- NFL draft: 1963: 17th round, 226th overall pick

Career history
- St. Louis Cardinals (1963–1969)

Awards and highlights
- First-team All-East (1962)

Career NFL statistics
- Fumble recoveries: 1
- Sacks: 1.0
- Stats at Pro Football Reference

David Michael Meggyesy (/ˈmɛɡɛsi/ MEG-eh-see; born November 1, 1941) is an American former football player, author, and union organizer. Meggyesy played college football for the Syracuse Orange and professionally for the St. Louis Cardinals of the National Football League (NFL).

Meggyesy wrote Out of Their League (1970), a controversial memoir about his experiences in football. The book was included in Sports Illustrated's top 100 sports books of all time.

== Early life and education ==
Meggyesy was born in Cleveland, Ohio, and is of Hungarian descent. His father was a machinist and union organizer. When he was five, his family moved to Glenwillow, Ohio, where he "was, literally, raised on a pig farm next to a dynamite factory." At Solon High School, in Solon, Ohio, he played football and other sports. He attended Syracuse University on an athletic scholarship.

== NFL career ==
Meggyesy was selected in the 17th round of the 1963 NFL draft by the St. Louis Cardinals, for whom he played for seven seasons as a linebacker.

During his early years in the NFL, Meggyesy was a graduate student in sociology at Washington University in St. Louis. He became involved in civil rights and anti-war activities while with the Cardinals.

Meggyesy retired from the game at age 29 and released his book Out Of Their League, which spoke about the "dehumanizing side of the game" and the "incredible violence".

== Post-NFL career ==
Meggyesy spent four months in 1970 at Jack Scott's Institute for the Study of Sport and Society in Oakland, California, where he wrote his memoir. He was interviewed on the Dick Cavett Show shortly before its publication. According to the San Jose Mercury News, the book was "the first critical look at the dehumanizing aspects of pro football." In 1973, Meggyesy was a co-founder of the Esalen Sports Center. After living in Colorado for several years, Meggesey's family returned to California. He began teaching courses at Stanford University, including Sports Consciousness and Social Change, and The Athlete and Society.

In 1980, while still teaching part-time at Stanford, he was hired as head football coach at Tamalpais High School, in Mill Valley, California. His son was one of three seniors on the varsity team, which had gone 2–8 the year before. In 1980, they were 0–11. Meggyesy later said, "We went 0-11, but it was a great experience to see them mature and gain confidence even when we were losing. High school football is football in its purest form. It struck me what a crucible for learning it was."

He was hired by the National Football League Players Association (NFLPA) as Western Regional Director. He retired in 2007.
