= Lokring Technology =

- Company type: Private
- Industry: Fluid System Technology (Gases & Liquids)
- Founded: 1988
- Headquarters: Willoughby, Ohio, U.S.
- Area served: Worldwide
- Key people: William Lennon (Chairman and President)
- Products: Fluid System Components: Couplings; Flanges; Elbows; Adapters
- Website: www.lokring.com

Lokring Technology is a privately held international company headquartered in Willoughby, Ohio that serves over 30 countries worldwide. The Chairman and President of the company is William Lennon, the grandson of Fred A. Lennon, founder of Swagelok. Lokring employs less than 100 workers at its headquarters.

Lokring designs patented, weld equivalent pipe and tube fittings such as couplings, flanges, elbows, adapters, and more. The unique technology of the patented Lokring fittings utilize "Elastic Strain Preload" (ESP), and possesses a metal to metal leak-free seal that compresses or swages the pipe/tube wall.

== Company history ==
The Lokring Joint was originally invented to replace the Apollo Joint in the Apollo I: Saturn Mission in 1968. In 1988, Robert Benson, Lucien Ruby, and Chris Dietemann formed Lokring Technology. By 1989, Lokring had completed its first full year of operations successfully. By 1994, Lokring was listed in the top 500 rising companies on Inc.com. Wabtec Corporation (formerly a George Westinghouse company) purchased Lokring Technology in 1998 and moved the plant to Burlington, Ontario. In 2002, Lokring Technology was purchased by William Lennon, a fluid system component entrepreneur and venture capitalist.

== Technology ==
Lokring patented connectors do not use elastomeric or rubber seals, O-rings, or gaskets. The Lokring patented connectors create their seal by shaping the pipe wall first elastically and then plastically with the connector. The connectors, based on helium testing, have a volatile organic compound emission rate that is no greater than 2.4*10-12 kilograms per hour or 4.6*10-8 pounds per year.

The technology works like this: during a piping installation, the axial movement of the Lokring driver over the fitting body swages the body onto the pipe surface, compressing the pipe wall first elastically and then plastically. When the pipe wall resists this swaging action, it generates high unit compressive loads at the contact points. These contact stresses are high enough to plastically yield the pipe surface under the multiple sealing lands, forming a 360-degree circumferential, permanent, metal-to-metal seal between the pipe and fitting body. Finally, the installation process causes the Lokring driver to grow slightly in diameter — an "elastic strain" — so that it exerts an elastic, radial preload on the metallic seals. This secures the fitting for the life of the connection.

=== LTCS-333 Corrosion Resistant Process Fitting ===
Several years ago, Lokring saw the opportunity to better serve the marketplace by developing a product that achieves the same integrity as welding but removes many of the challenges and long-term costs of hot work.

In January 2010, the company introduced a new LTCS-333 Process Fitting, based on its tested ESP technology. Using the same design, LTCS-333 Fittings incorporated a new material — low temp 4130 carbon steel — that provided a new scope of capabilities for users.

== Notable Uses ==
The company is prominent in the Shipbuilding (e.g. General Dynamics), Submarine (Marine) (e.g. BAE Systems Submarine Solutions), Oil & Gas (Upstream and Downstream), and Nuclear Generation Industries, but also caters to other markets such as Steel (e.g. ArcelorMittal), Pharmaceutical (e.g. Merck & Co.), Medical Gas e.g. (Walter Reed Army Medical Center), Railroad (e.g. Union Pacific Railroad), and many more.

ExxonMobil identified pipe-fitting technology created by Lokring as an alternative to hot work welding during their MEV (Maintenance Efficiency Venture) initiative in 2007. At the time, Lokring was already a supplier to ExxonMobil. A USCIB Case Study described the following gains: productivity and overall cost savings of about two-thirds in many settings and much improved safety due to the departure from hot work. This expanded partnership has benefited both companies: a safer, less-expensive technology for ExxonMobil and its facilities worldwide, and enhanced comprehension of and greater accessibility to foreign markets for Lokring.

Indeed, ExxonMobil’s support of Lokring’s pipe-fitting technology has helped to promote the expansion of Lokring into new countries. Prior to the MEV partnership Lokring had no presence in Japan. MEV worked with Lokring in order to meet Japanese piping specifications to use the Lokring product in ExxonMobil’s local facilities. In addition, ExxonMobil’s Japanese subsidiaries drove Lokring to establish in-country distribution channels to service new customers in additional industries. As Lokring President William Lennon states, "Our ExxonMobil partnership has been a catalyst for our international expansion. There is no doubt that this partnership allowed us to enter the Japanese market years earlier — and much stronger — than we would have if entering on our own. Our global expansion has created jobs in these countries and in Ohio as well."
