= Dallas Lauderdale =

American basketball player (born 1988)

Free agent
- Position: Power forward

Personal information
- Born: September 11, 1988 (age 37) Solon, Ohio, U.S.
- Listed height: 6 ft 8 in (2.03 m)
- Listed weight: 260 lb (118 kg)

Career information
- High school: Solon (Solon, Ohio)
- College: Ohio State (2007–2011)
- NBA draft: 2011: undrafted
- Playing career: 2011–present

Career history
- 2011–2012: Turów Zgorzelec
- 2013–2014: Idaho Stampede
- 2016–2017, 2018–2019: Maine Red Claws

Career highlights
- Big Ten All-Defensive Team (2010); NIT champion (2008)
- Stats at Basketball Reference

Dallas Lauderdale (born September 11, 1988) is an American professional basketball player who last played for the Maine Red Claws of the NBA G League. He played college basketball for the Ohio State University.

== High school and college career ==
Lauderdale attended Solon High School in Solon, Ohio where he led them to the Western Reserve Conference championships in each of his four seasons, as well as two regional runner-up finishes his sophomore and junior years. In his four-year high school career, he averaged 24 points, 12 rebounds, six blocks and two assists per game.

In his four-year college career at Ohio State, Lauderdale played 138 games (102 starts) while averaging 4.2 points, 3.5 rebounds and 1.5 blocks in 17.6 minutes per game. As a junior in 2009–10, he was named to the Big Ten All-Defensive team.

== Professional career ==
=== 2011–12 season ===
Lauderdale went undrafted in the 2011 NBA draft. On July 29, 2011, he signed a one-year deal with Turów Zgorzelec of the Polish Basketball League.

=== 2012–13 season ===
In July 2012, Lauderdale joined the Golden State Warriors for the 2012 NBA Summer League. On September 21, 2012, he signed with the Portland Trail Blazers. However, he was later waived by the Trail Blazers on October 27, 2012. On October 31, 2012, he was acquired by the Idaho Stampede as an affiliate player. On November 21, 2012, he was waived by the Stampede due to injury and subsequently missed the entire 2012–13 season.

=== 2013–14 season ===
In July 2013, Lauderdale joined the Portland Trail Blazers for the 2013 NBA Summer League. In November 2013, he was reacquired by the Idaho Stampede.

=== 2014–15 season ===
On September 22, 2014, Lauderdale signed with the Charlotte Hornets. However, he was later waived by the Hornets on October 24, 2014.

=== 2016–17 season ===
On October 30, 2016, Lauderdale was selected by the Fort Wayne Mad Ants in the first round of the 2016 NBA Development League draft and later traded to the Maine Red Claws for the rights to Omari Johnson and Adam Woodbury.

=== 2018–19 season ===
In October 2018 Lauderdale was added to the training camp roster of the Maine Red Claws.

== Personal life ==
Lauderdale is the son of Dallas II and Carol Lauderdale and the nephew of Jim Chones, a former NBA player who played for the Cleveland Cavaliers. He is also the cousin of former WNBA player Kaayla Chones.
