= Fred Lennon =

Fred Lennon may refer to:

- Alfred Lennon (1912–1976), father of English musician John Lennon
- Fred A. Lennon (1905–1998), American manufacturer and philanthropist
