= Jack Van Antwerp =

American photographer and journalist

Jack Van Antwerp is an American photography and journalism professional, He is noted as The Wall Street Journal's first global Director of Photography who migrated The Journal from a mostly text-only print and online newspaper to a visual publication.

== Education ==
Raised in Cleveland, Van Antwerp was educated at the Hawken School, Solon High School, and Rochester Institute of Technology. Graduating in 1986 with a BA in Photojournalism & Documentary Photography, Van Antwerp spent the next ten years working between New York and Cleveland as a freelance photographer while also serving as Cleveland Orchestra's staff photographer.

== Career ==
Moving to New York full-time, Van Antwerp joined CNN in 2000 where he worked with David Turnley as his field producer during the Invasion of Iraq. Upon returning to the states, Van Antwerp joined The New York Times as a staff reporter and photo editor, while also contributing to Play Magazine. Near the end of his time at NYTimes, Van Antwerp began contributing to The Wall Street Journal. Soon afterwards he was hired as the magazine's first global Director of Photography.

During his tenure as Director of Photography, Van Antwerp oversaw WSJ's expanded the use of images to boost traffic, curated the magazine's year-ending Best of Photography video series, established the Photo Journal blog, unveiled behind-the-scenes footage at magazine to the general public, and increased payment to and contributions from the magazines fleet of freelance photographers.

Van Antwerp stepped down from his position at WSJ in 2014.
