= Michael Grepp =

American singer-songwriter

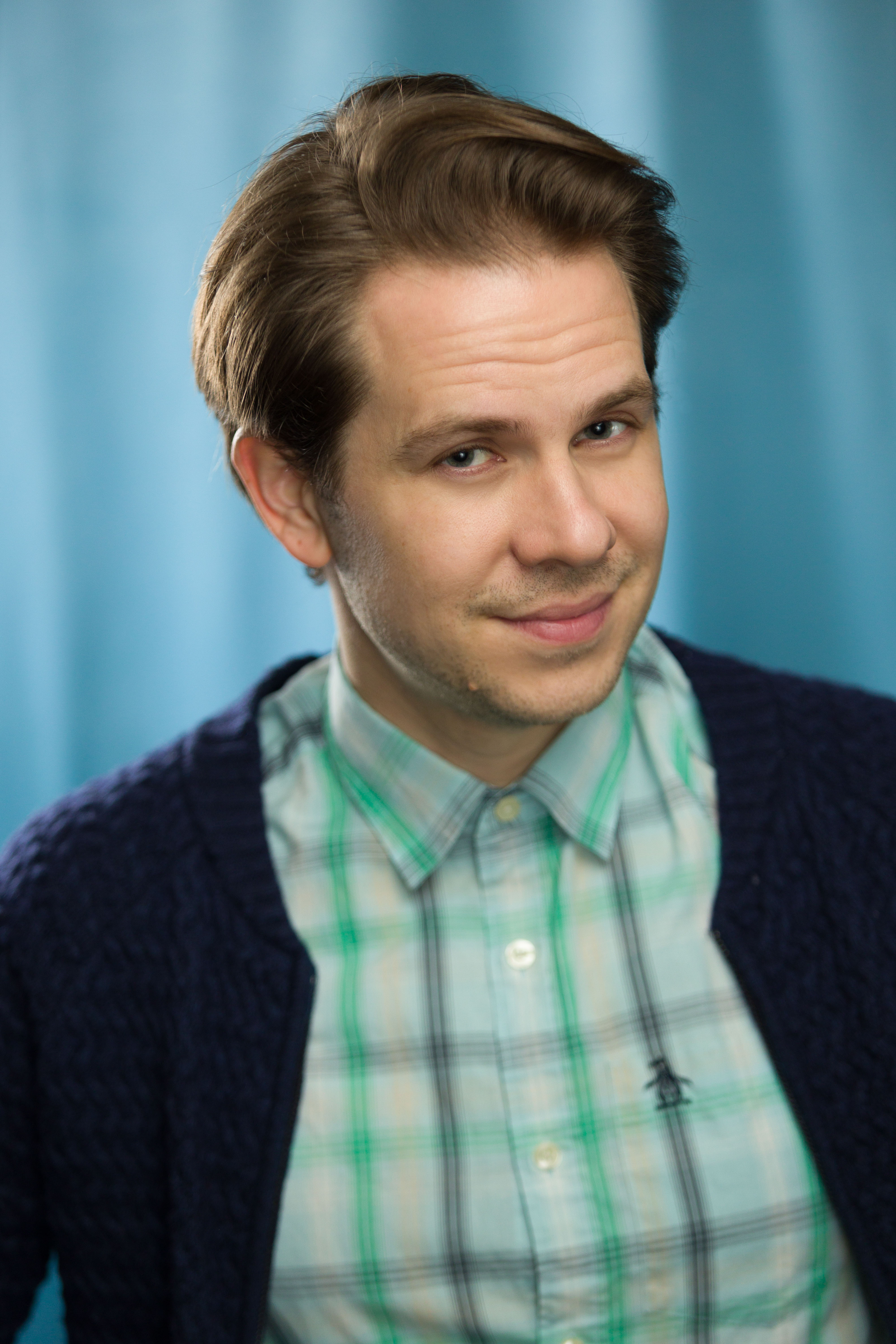
- Comedic headshot of Michael Grepp.

Background information
- Origin: Cleveland, Ohio, USA
- Genres: Indie; Acoustic; Singer-Songwriter
- Occupations: Actor; Musician
- Years active: 2002–present
- Label: Independent
- Members: Michael Grepp
- Website: Official Site

Michael Grepp (born July 31, 1985 ) is an American actor, voice over artist, and musician.

Raised in Solon, Ohio he attended Solon High School from 2000–2004. During this period he played in several local pop/rock bands, competing in various battle of the bands and High School Rock Offs in the greater Cleveland area. Upon graduating from Solon High School he went on to study Architecture at Miami University in Oxford, Ohio, eventually pursuing music alongside musical Kate Voegele, Powerspace, and Look Afraid. In September 2008 he became singer and rhythm guitarist for the Cincinnati/Dayton based band Just Above Jealous, staying with the band up until the groups mutual decision to go in separate directions in early February 2009. During his time with Just Above Jealous he began to write and record demos for several of the songs which would eventually make up The Hampshire EP, before finally returning to Miami University to graduate with a degree in Philosophy.

In the summer of 2010 The Hampshire EP was released, with its namesake derived from a side street off of Coventry Road near the studio where it was recorded. The Hampshire EP focused on the creation of acoustic based songs with ambient moods that featured storytelling through layered vocal melodies. While recording this album he stumbled upon a local acting school, training in the Meisner Technique with a teacher from Los Angeles. He began appearing in local theatre and film productions in the greater Cleveland area.

After moving out to Los Angeles, California in 2011 to further pursue music, he began acting professionally in TV and Film. His career gained a footing once he secured representation, auditioning for Saturday Night Live and pitching animated series to Adult Swim. However his work gained national exposure when a cartoon he co-created with his animation company Loserville Animation Studios was selected as an official entrant in a reboot of the iconic Spike and Mike's Festival of Animation.

== Filmography ==
Year	Title	Role	Notes
2011	The Ides of March (Film)	Student	
2013	Slap Happy (Short Film)	Coworker 2	
2016	Eddie Murphybed (TV Series)	Eddie Murphybed	1 episode
2019	Fresh Off the Boat (TV Series)	Random Juggalo	1 episode
2019	America's Court with Judge Ross (TV Series)	Mark Johnson	1 episode
2020	Finger Guns (TV Series)	Russian Thug	1 episode
2022	Adjunct (TV Series)	Barista	1 episode
2025	Spike and Mike's Festival of Animation (Film)	Lindsay	
2026	We the People (court show) (TV Series)	Vincent Gramly	1 episode

== Discography ==
=== Ep's and Single's ===
- "The Hampshire EP" (2010)
- "An Allusion From" (2007)
