= Solon City School District =

School district in Ohio, United States

Solon City Schools

Address
- 33800 Inwood Drive Solon, Ohio, 44139; United States
- Coordinates: 41°23′24″N 81°26′32″W

District information
- Type: Public
- Motto: "Empowering Every Student, Every Day"
- Grades: Pre-Kindergarten through High School
- Established: 1895; 131 years ago
- President: Julie Glavin
- Vice-president: Leann Jones
- Superintendent: Fred Bolden
- Asst. superintendent(s): Deborah Siegel
- Accreditation: Ohio Department of Education
- Schools: Solon High School; Solon Middle School; Orchard Middle School; Lewis Elementary School; Parkside Elementary School; Roxbury Elementary School; Regano Preschool
- Budget: $70 million
- NCES District ID: 3904660

Students and staff
- Students: 4,594 (2024-2025)
- Teachers: 250.46
- Staff: 611 (2024-2025)
- Student–teacher ratio: 18.34
- Athletic conference: Northeast Ohio Conference
- District mascot: Comets
- Colors: Navy Blue; White; Gold

Other information
- Website: www.solonschools.org

Solon City School District is a public school district serving Solon and Glenwillow, Ohio, which are southeastern suburbs of Cleveland in the Northeast Ohio Region, the 15th largest Combined statistical area in the United States.

== Schools ==
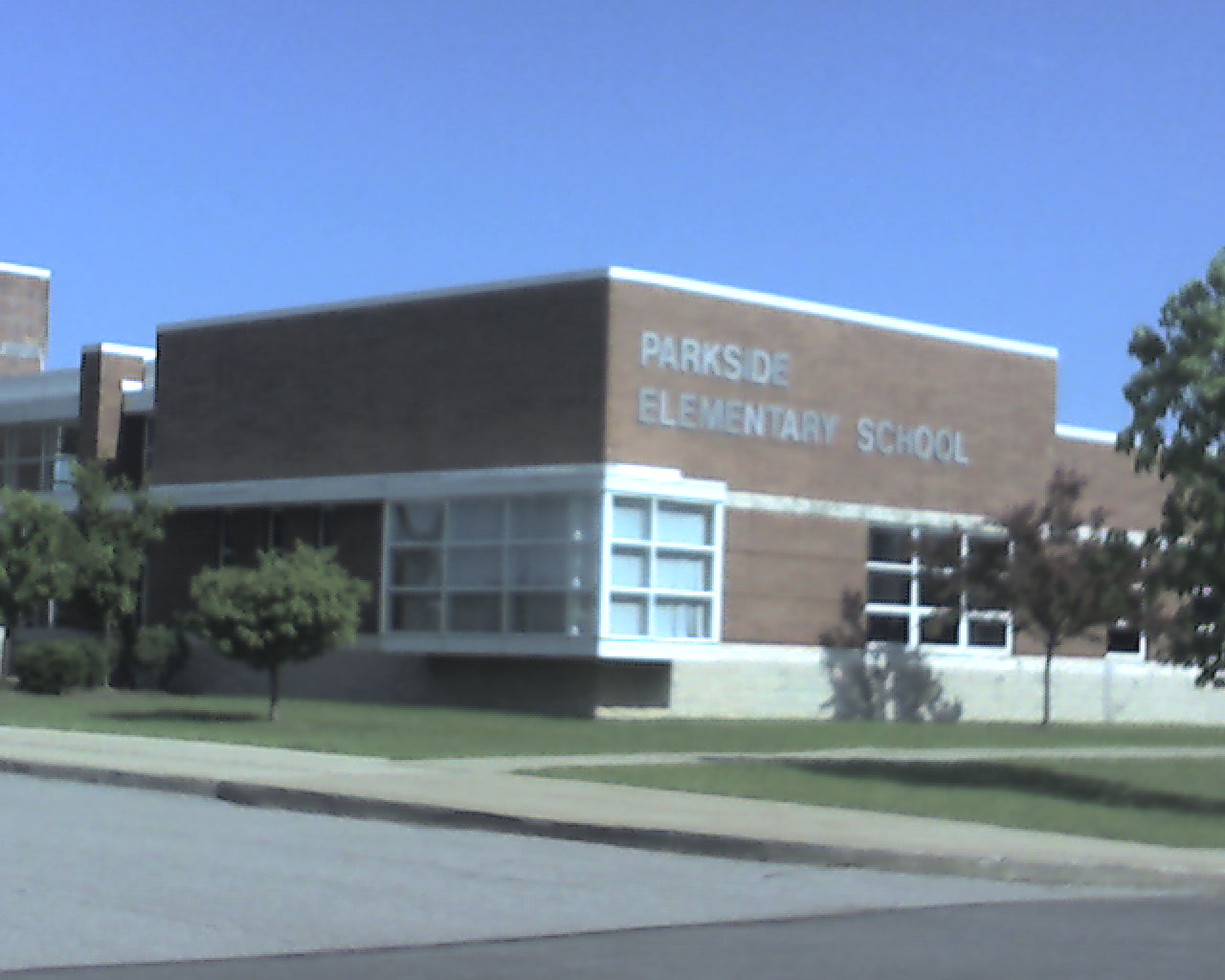
Parkside Elementary School

=== High school ===
- Solon High School (9–12)

=== Middle schools ===
- Solon Middle School (7–8)
- Orchard Middle School (5–6)

=== Elementary schools ===
- Dorothy E. Lewis Elementary School (K–4)
- Parkside Elementary School (K–4)
- Grace L. Roxbury Elementary School (K–4)

=== Preschool ===
- Joseph V. Regano Early Learning Center

== History ==
=== Academics ===
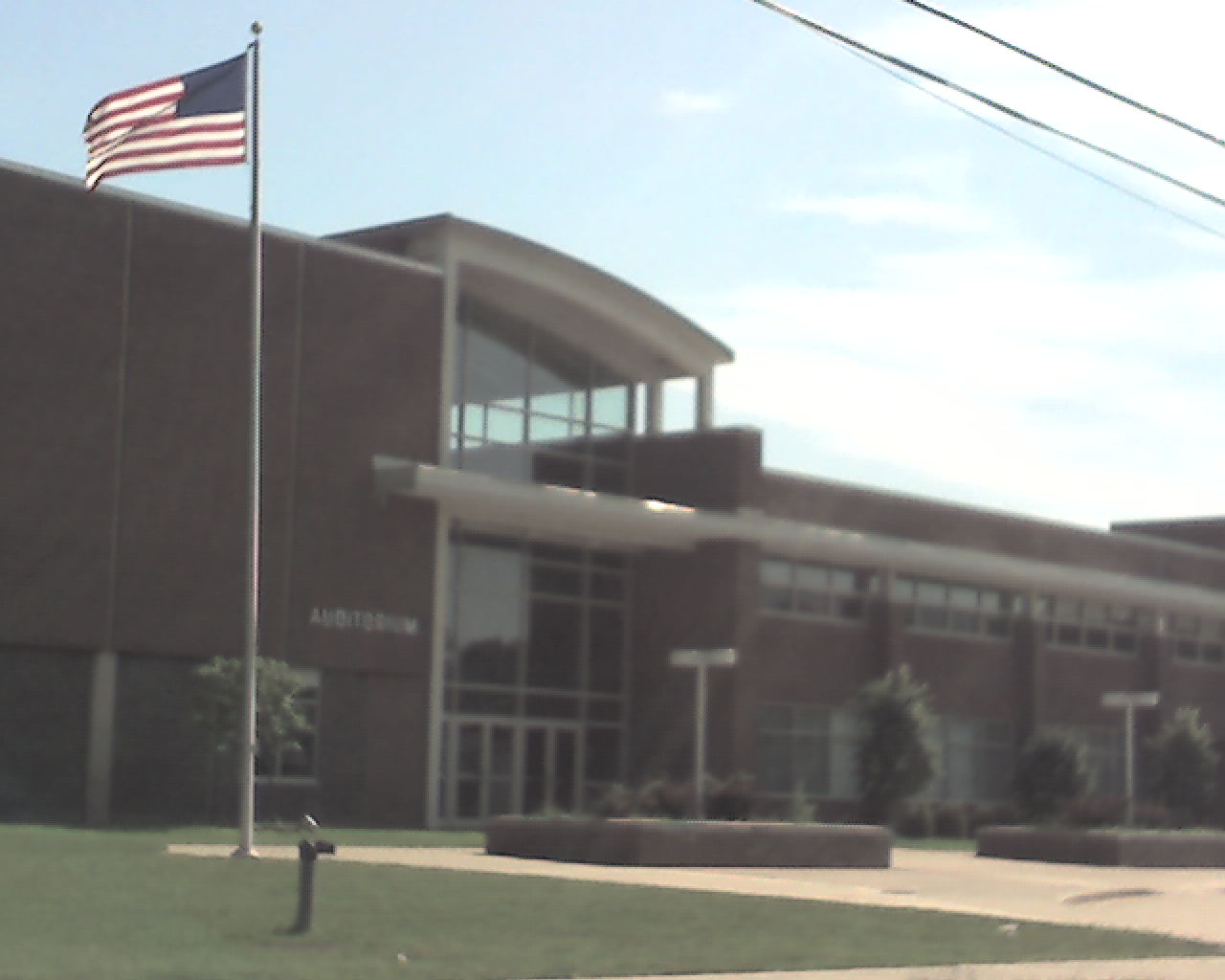
Solon High School

In 2012, Solon achieved a rating of 111.2 on the Ohio state performance index and for the 13th consecutive year, the district met all 26 indicators measured on the state report card. This rating kept the Solon school district among the top five school districts in the state of Ohio, in 2012 ranking #3. The district was listed in Forbes "Top 20 Best Schools for Your Housing Buck" in 2013 at #18.

In 2013, Solon High School was listed as #107 on Newsweek's annual list of America's Best High Schools. The school was given a gold ranking and listed #264 by U.S. News & World Report, #11 in Ohio, and #100 nationally in STEM.

In 2013, Solon High School was awarded the prestigious Red Quill Award from the ACT organization for the sixth consecutive year, and the Red Quill Legacy Award for the second consecutive year, for excellent overall student scores on the ACT. Solon was the only Ohio school to receive the award and one of 21 in the Midwest.

The Solon City School District has also gained recognition for its Science Olympiad and Academic Challenge teams. Among numerous other awards, the Solon Middle School Science Olympiad has taken 1st place at the past six national tournaments (2008-2013), and Solon High School has placed 1st at the past three national tournaments(2011-2013). Members and coaches from both teams have been invited to the annual White House Science Fair multiple times. The teams have also received commendations from the Ohio State Legislature.

In 2017, Niche.com ranked the school district the best in the United States based on analysis that considered factors such as graduation rates, teacher quality, scores on state tests and college admission exams, and economic and racial diversity.

==== Blue Ribbon Awards ====
Schools of the district have been recognized by the National Blue Ribbon Schools Program, considered to be the highest honor an American school can achieve, multiple times over the past few decades. Arthur Road Elementary School, Dorothy E. Lewis Elementary School, and Parkside Elementary School have each been recognized, in 2005, 2006, and 2009, respectively.

Solon Middle School received an award in 2010 and Orchard Middle School was one of only two public middle schools in Ohio to receive a Blue Ribbon School Award in 2013.

Solon High School is one of few schools to have received Blue Ribbon awards twice, both in 1991 and 2009.

== Board of education ==
Current leaders and board members are:

- Fred Bolden, Superintendent
- Deborah Siegel, Assistant Superintendent and Curriculum Manager
- Tim Rosenbaum, Director of Business and Personnel
- Tim Pickana, Treasurer
- Julie Glavin, President
- Leann Jones, Vice President
- Kevin Patton
- John Heckman
- Michele Barksdale
