= Play (The New York Times) =

Play Magazine was a weekly online sports magazine, associated with The New York Times. The magazine was later published quarterly. It was first published in February 2006. Mark Bryant was the editor-in-chief of the magazine, which ceased publication in Fall 2008.
