= Swagelok =

American fluid system products and services company

Swagelok Company
- Company type: Private
- Industry: Fluid system technology
- Founded: 1947
- Founder: Fred A. Lennon; Cullen Crawford
- Headquarters: Solon, Ohio, U.S.
- Number of locations: 200 sales and service centers, 20 manufacturing facilities, 5 technical centers
- Area served: Worldwide
- Key people: Thomas F. Lozick, (CEO)
- Products: Fittings, Valves, Hose (tubing), Gauges, Transducers, Regulators, Miniature Modular Systems, Orbital welding systems, Measurement Systems
- Revenue: US$1.8 billion (2011)
- Number of employees: 4,800
- Subsidiaries: Swagelok Capital Projects Company
- Website: www.swagelok.com

Swagelok Company is a $2 billion privately held developer of fluid system products, assemblies, and services for the oil and gas, chemical and petrochemical, semiconductor, and transportation industries.

Headquartered in Solon, Ohio, U.S.A., Swagelok operates through approximately 200 sales and service centers in 70 countries, and employs over 5,700 associates at 20 manufacturing facilities and five global technology centers.

== History ==
Fred A. Lennon and Cullen B. Crawford founded Crawford Fitting Company in Cleveland, Ohio, in July 1947 to manufacture the Swagelok tube fitting, which used a two-ferrule design to “swage” or form the tube and lock it into place. One year later, Lennon bought out Crawford and continued to grow the business.

In 1949, Lennon hired his first employee and established his own manufacturing facility on East 140th Street in Cleveland. In 1965, the company moved to Solon, Ohio, where its headquarters remain.

Additionally, in 1949, the first independent sales and service center opened in the United States. The sales and service network expanded to Europe in 1969 and to Asia in 1972. Today, sales and service centers are located in 70 countries, providing customers with local inventory, services, and support.

Throughout the 1950s and 1960s, Lennon continued to expand the product line through companies and brands, including Whitey, Cajon, Nupro, and ‘Sno-Trik. In 1997, the company focused its identity on a single logo and brand name: Swagelok.

== Products ==
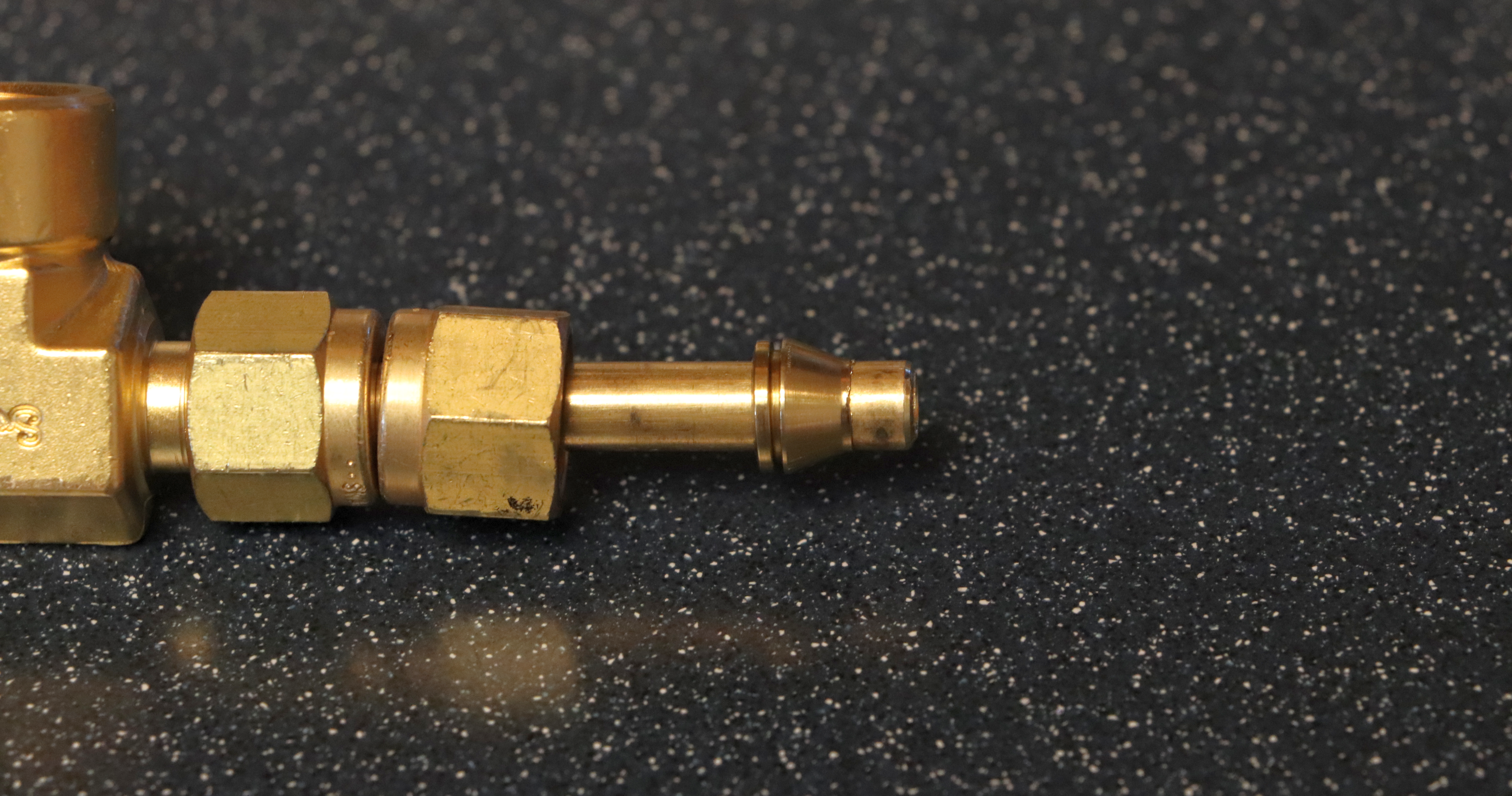
A brass Swagelok connection

Product offerings include fittings, valves, regulators, hoses, filters, sample cylinders, tubing, and measurement devices.
