= Glenwillow, Ohio =

- Village
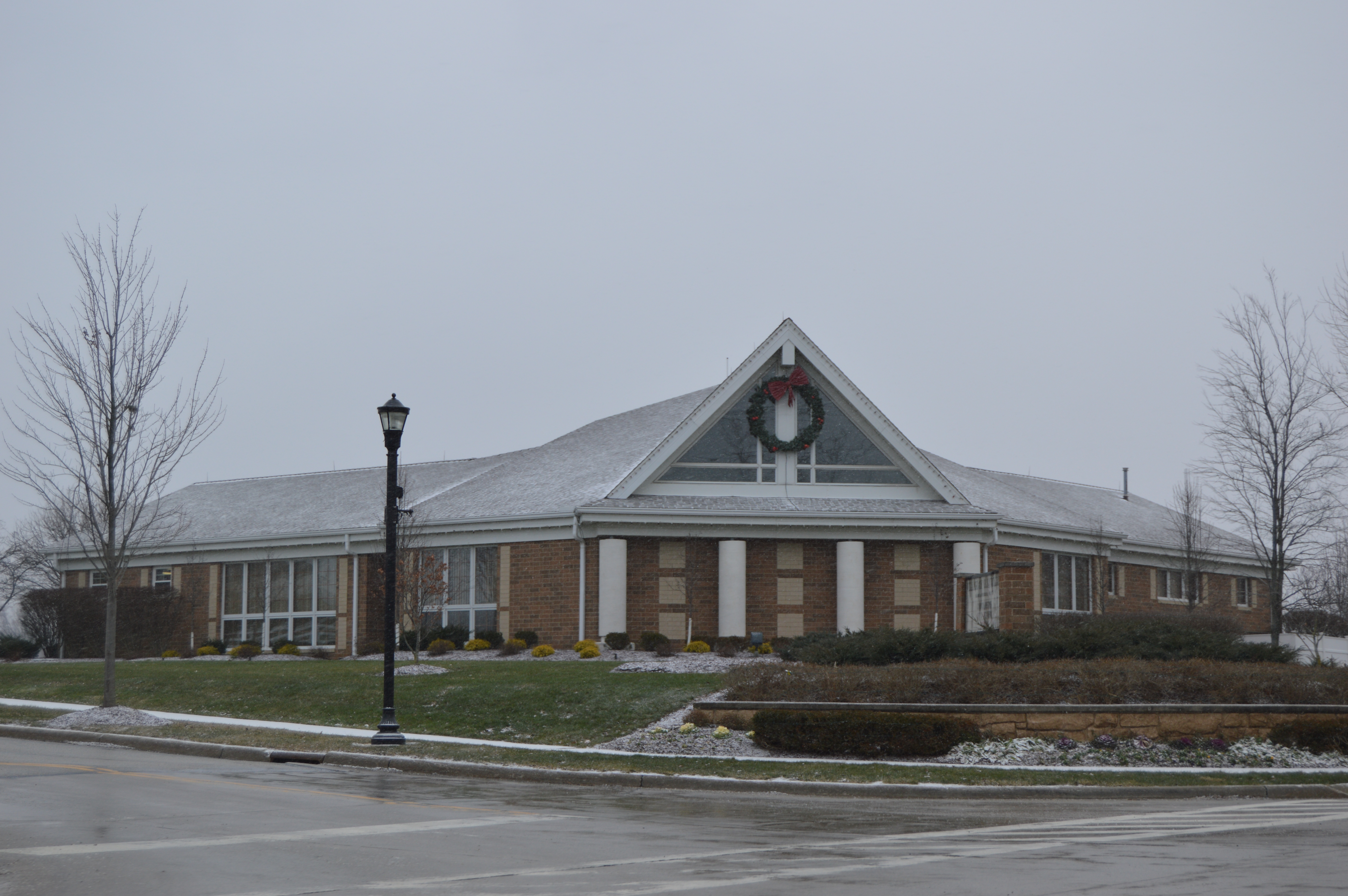
- Village Hall
- Interactive map of Glenwillow, Ohio
- Location within Ohio Location within the United States
- Coordinates: 41°21′39″N 81°28′20″W
- Country: United States
- State: Ohio
- County: Cuyahoga

Government
  - Mayor: Mark A. Cegelka (D)

Area
  - Total: 2.83 sq mi (7.34 km^{2})
  - Land: 2.77 sq mi (7.18 km^{2})
  - Water: 0.062 sq mi (0.16 km^{2})
- Elevation: 942 ft (287 m)

Population (2020)
  - Total: 994
  - Estimate (2023): 977
  - Density: 358.6/sq mi (138.44/km^{2})
- Time zone: UTC-5 (Eastern (EST))
  - Summer (DST): UTC-4 (EDT)
- ZIP code: 44139
- Area code: 440
- FIPS code: 39-30632
- GNIS feature ID: 1064733
- Website: http://www.glenwillow-oh.gov/

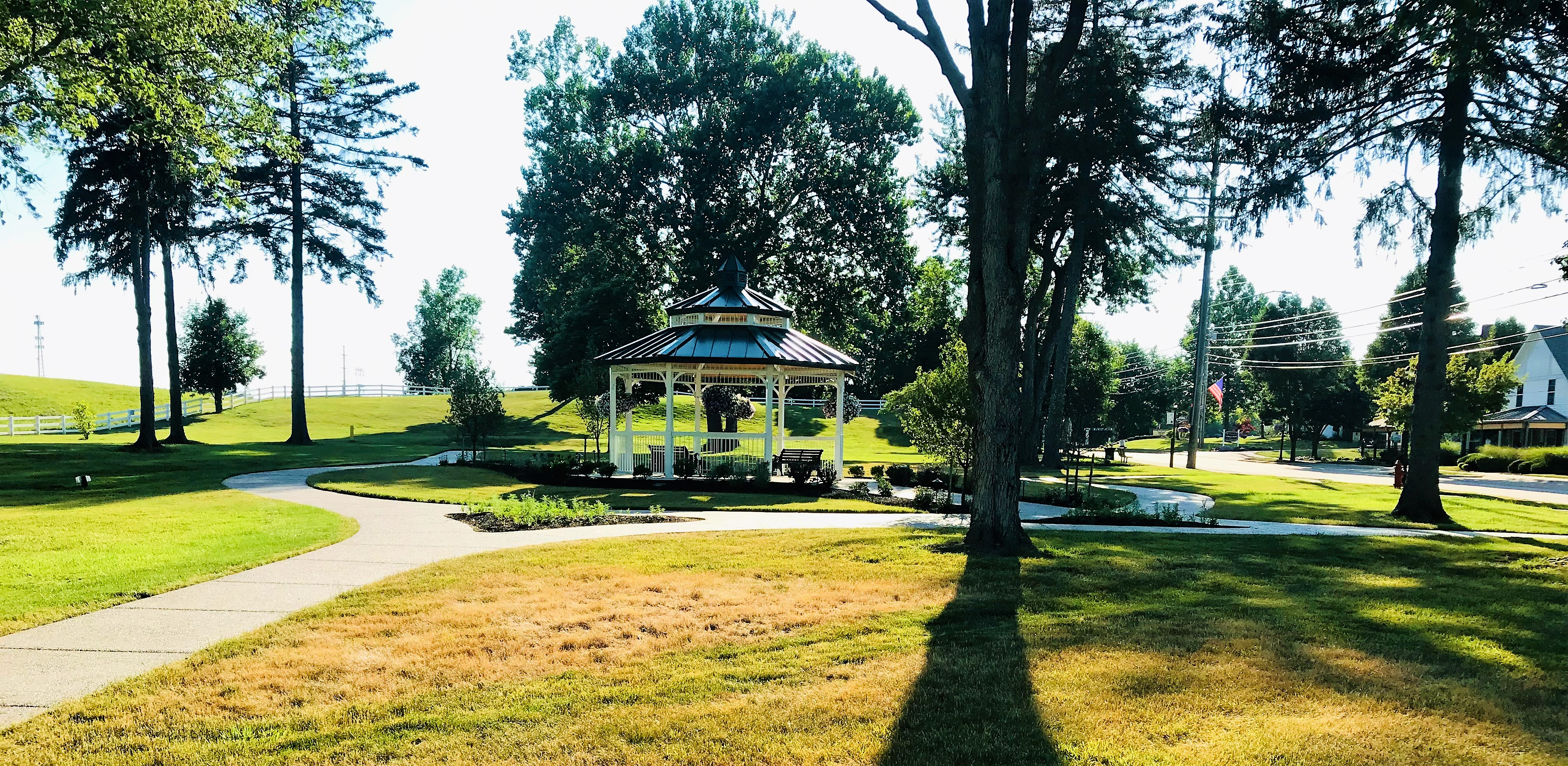
Pettibone Park in Glenwillow Town Center

Glenwillow is a village in Cuyahoga County, Ohio, United States. The population was 994 at the 2020 census. A suburb of Cleveland, it is a part of the Cleveland metropolitan area.

== History ==
The Village of Glenwillow was carved out of Solon Township and established in 1893 as a company town by Austin Powder Company. As the population in surrounding areas, particularly the city of Solon, increased, Austin Powder was unable to test its explosive products. It moved its manufacturing operations to Athens, Ohio, and closed its Glenwillow plant in 1972. In the 1980s, the village installed infrastructural and utility improvements and added a 250-acre (1.0 km^{2}) industrial park. Served by the Solon City Schools, the village has since experienced residential development. In the early 2000s, the village received significant investment through mixed-use development, including renovation of the former Austin Powder housing stock and general store into boutiques, a tavern, in conjunction with a new town center, village park and new housing in a town plan layout.

== Geography ==
Glenwillow is located at 41°21′39″N 81°28′20″W (41.360821, -81.472234).

According to the United States Census Bureau, the village has a total area of 2.78 square miles (7.20 km^{2}), of which 2.72 square miles (7.04 km^{2}) is land and 0.06 square miles (0.16 km^{2}) is water.

== Demographics ==
Historical population
Census	Pop.	Note	%±
1920	200		—
1930	215		7.5%
1940	218		1.4%
1950	257		17.9%
1960	359		39.7%
1970	508		41.5%
1980	492		−3.1%
1990	455		−7.5%
2000	449		−1.3%
2010	923		105.6%
2020	994		7.7%
2023 (est.)	977	▼	−1.7%
U.S. Decennial Census

=== 2020 census ===
Glenwillow village, Ohio – Racial and ethnic composition Note: the US Census treats Hispanic/Latino as an ethnic category. This table excludes Latinos from the racial categories and assigns them to a separate category. Hispanics/Latinos may be of any race.
Race / Ethnicity (NH = Non-Hispanic)	Pop 2000	Pop 2010	Pop 2020	% 2000	% 2010	% 2020
White alone (NH)	422	524	437	93.99%	56.77%	43.96%
Black or African American alone (NH)	19	265	330	4.23%	28.71%	33.20%
Native American or Alaska Native alone (NH)	0	1	0	0.00%	0.11%	0.00%
Asian alone (NH)	0	96	178	0.00%	10.40%	17.91%
Native Hawaiian or Pacific Islander alone (NH)	0	0	0	0.00%	0.00%	0.00%
Other race alone (NH)	0	0	6	0.00%	0.00%	0.60%
Mixed race or Multiracial (NH)	5	27	32	1.11%	2.93%	3.22%
Hispanic or Latino (any race)	3	10	11	0.67%	1.08%	1.11%
Total	449	923	994	100.00%	100.00%	100.00%

=== 2010 census ===
As of the census of 2010, there were 923 people, 316 households, and 197 families living in the village. The population density was 339.3 inhabitants per square mile (131.0/km^{2}). There were 383 housing units at an average density of 140.8 per square mile (54.4/km^{2}). The racial makeup of the village was 57.4% White, 28.7% African American, 0.2% Native American, 10.4% Asian, 0.3% from other races, and 2.9% from two or more races. Hispanic or Latino of any race were 1.1% of the population.

There were 316 households, of which 43.7% had children under the age of 18 living with them, 48.4% were married couples living together, 11.7% had a female householder with no husband present, 2.2% had a male householder with no wife present, and 37.7% were non-families. 31.0% of all households were made up of individuals, and 13.9% had someone living alone who was 65 years of age or older. The average household size was 2.64 and the average family size was 3.38.

The median age in the village was 41.2 years. 28.3% of residents were under the age of 18; 4.2% were between the ages of 18 and 24; 24.5% were from 25 to 44; 22.5% were from 45 to 64; and 20.4% were 65 years of age or older. The gender makeup of the village was 47.9% male and 52.1% female.

=== 2000 census ===
As of the census of 2000, there were 449 people, 205 households, and 110 families living in the village. The population density was 165.4 inhabitants per square mile (63.9/km^{2}). There were 222 housing units at an average density of 81.8 per square mile (31.6/km^{2}). The racial makeup of the village was 94.65% White, 4.23% African American, and 1.11% from two or more races. Hispanic or Latino of any race were 0.67% of the population.

There were 205 households, out of which 24.4% had children under the age of 18 living with them, 38.5% were married couples living together, 11.2% had a female householder with no husband present, and 46.3% were non-families. 41.0% of all households were made up of individuals, and 10.2% had someone living alone who was 65 years of age or older. The average household size was 2.15 and the average family size was 2.91.

In the village, the population was spread out, with 21.8% under the age of 18, 4.5% from 18 to 24, 32.1% from 25 to 44, 28.3% from 45 to 64, and 13.4% who were 65 years of age or older. The median age was 40 years. For every 100 females, there were 109.8 males. For every 100 females age 18 and over, there were 119.4 males.

The median income for a household in the village was $37,708, and the median income for a family was $52,321. Males had a median income of $42,292 versus $27,500 for females. The per capita income for the village was $19,942. About 2.7% of families and 5.0% of the population were below the poverty line, including 5.2% of those under age 18 and 3.4% of those age 65 or over.
