= Solon High School =

Public high school in Solon, Ohio

- Solon High School Comets logo

Location
- 33600 Inwood Road; Solon, Ohio 44139; United States; 41°22′39″N 81°26′26″W

Information
- Type: Public
- Established: 1898
- School district: Solon City School District
- Principal: Dakota Berg
- Teaching staff: 81.80 (FTE)
- Grades: 9-12
- Enrollment: 1,519 (2024-2025)
- Student to teacher ratio: 18.57
- Colors: Navy Blue; White; Gold
- Athletics conference: Suburban League
- Team name: Comets
- Rival: Twinsburg High School
- Newspaper: The SHS Courier
- Website: www.solonschools.org/shs

Solon High School, founded in 1898, is a public high school located in Solon, Ohio, a southeastern suburb of Cleveland in the Northeast Ohio Region, the 15th largest Combined Statistical Area in the United States.

It comprises grades 9 through 12 and is the only high school in the Solon City School District, which also includes Solon and Orchard Middle Schools, three elementary schools: Lewis, Parkside and Roxbury, and a preschool, Regano. Solon High School's student body is approximately 1,500 students while the faculty roster includes approximately 200 teachers, administrators, and staff. Dakota Berg currently serves as the principal. The original section of the current building was first constructed for the 1949–50 school year.

Enrollment By Grade (2024–2025)
	9 (Freshmen)	10 (Sophomore)	11 (Juniors)	12 (Seniors)
Students	366	408	361	384

== Miscellaneous Statistics ==
Enrollment By Gender
	Male	Female
Students	795	724

The student body of Solon High School as a whole contains 1,519 students as of 2025, 795 of those students are male and 724 of those students are female.

Enrollment By Race
	Native American*	Asian	Black	Hispanic	White	Pacific Islander	Mixed Race
Student	2	367	266	51	742	2	89

== Academics ==
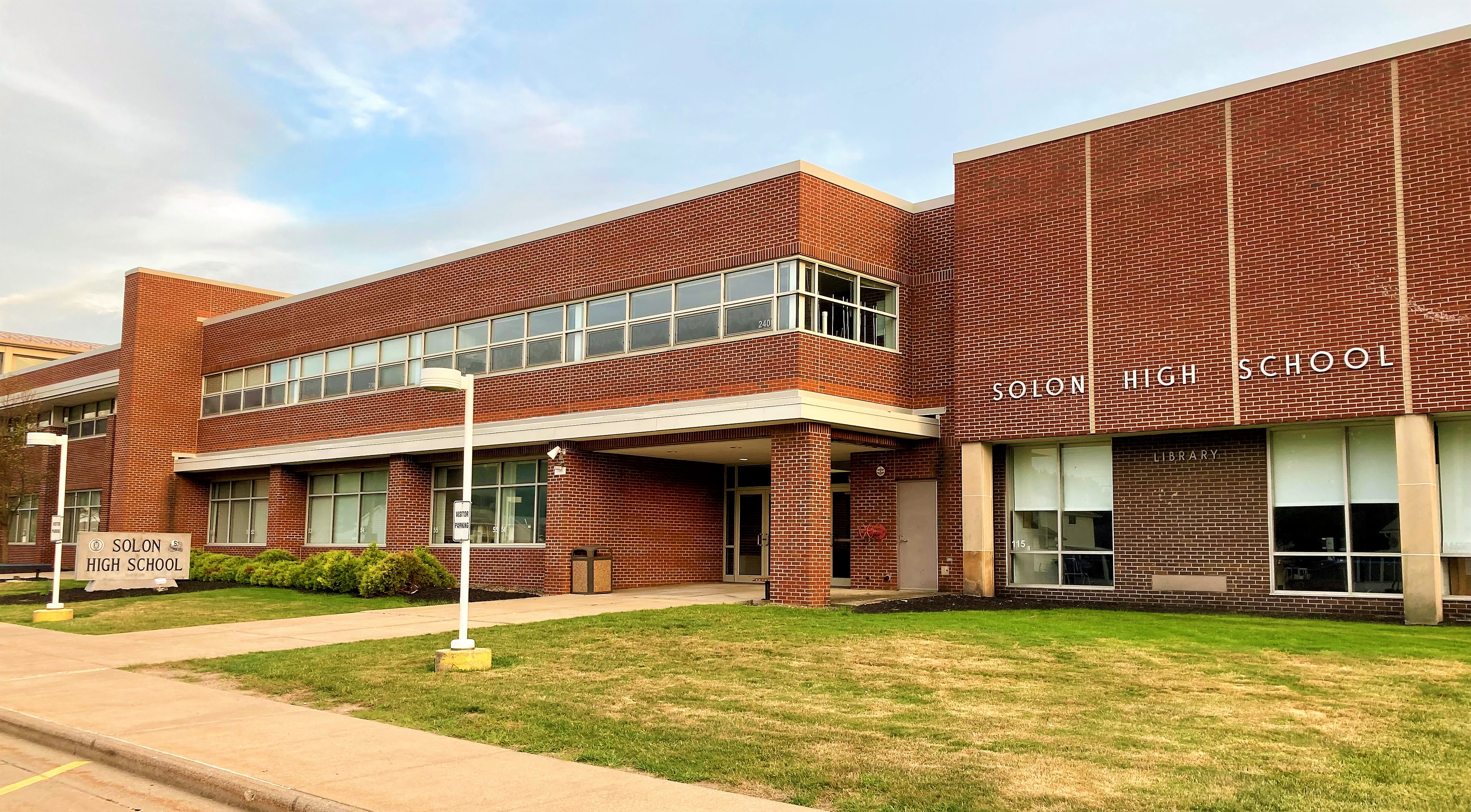
Solon High School

Solon High School and the entire Solon City School District consistently rank among the best schools in Ohio. In 2021, the Solon School District was named the best Public School District in America by the community and academic rating organization Niche.com. That same year, Solon High School was listed as #181 on Niche's list of America's Best Public High Schools and #3 Best Public High School in Ohio. The school was given a Gold Ranking and listed as #211 by U.S. News & World Report and #7 in Ohio.

Solon High School is one of few schools to have received Blue Ribbon awards twice, both in 1991 and 2009.

Solon High School students are perennially recognized by the National Merit Scholarship Program. The class of 2021 had 19 Solon High School students named as National Merit Finalists and 14 Commended Students, while the class of 2022 had 34 Semi-Finalists and 16 Commended students. This was the highest number in Ohio.

In 2013, Solon High School was awarded the prestigious Red Quill Award from the ACT organization for the sixth consecutive year, and the Red Quill Legacy Award for the second consecutive year, for excellent overall student scores on the ACT (Test). Solon was the only Ohio school to receive the award and one of 21 in the Midwest.

Students are also often recognized for their performance on Advanced Placement Exams. Solon has over a 90% pass rate, and currently offers 27 AP courses. The school has had many students recognized for number of exams taken and high average scores as AP Scholars and others for being members of the less than 0.005% that have received perfect scores on their exams.

== Athletics ==
The Solon Comets' athletic programs compete in the Suburban League against other local area high schools. Solon's high school sports rivals include Twinsburg High School, Hudson High School, Mentor High School, and Mayfield High School.

Solon's mascot is the comet and its colors are blue and white. The school's fight song is "We Fight with the Might of the Blue, Gold, and White."

=== State championships ===
- Wrestling – 1990
- Girls track and field – 2013, 2014
- Boys cross country – 2016

== Academic teams ==
Solon High School has many academic teams, including Science Olympiad, Academic Challenge, Mock Trial, Speech and Debate, Model United Nations, and Future Problem Solvers. Many of these teams have previously placed in tournaments at the state and national level.

=== Academic Challenge ===
The Solon High School Academic Challenge team has competed in the National Academic Quiz Tournaments High School National Championship for eight straight years, earning a fifth-place finish in 2015. The team won the 2010 Ohio Academic Competition state championship as well as a 17th finish at the NAQT High School National Championship.

=== Science Olympiad ===
In 1998, Solon Science Olympiad earned its first national championship and has consistently placed at the regional, state, and national levels. Solon Science Olympiad placed second in both 2003 and 2008, and then placed first at the 2011, 2012, and 2013 National Tournaments, tying them with Troy High School from Fullerton, California for the most consecutive wins (3). They attended the White House Science Fair two times and received commendations from the Ohio State Legislature as a result of these accomplishments. At the 2019 National Tournament, Solon High School placed second at the National Tournament behind Troy High School.

=== Speech and debate ===
The Solon High School Speech and Debate team is one of the largest and most successful programs of its kind in the state of Ohio. The team placed second at the Ohio Speech and Debate Association State Tournament in 2014, 2016, 2017, and 2021, and placed first in the state in 2022 for the first time in the program's history. It has produced 15 individual state champions since the team's inception. The team has also qualified numerous members to the National Speech and Debate Association (NSDA) National Tournament and was designated as a School of Outstanding Distinction in 2022 for ranking among the top 10 teams in the nation. Solon produced national finalists in 2017 and 2022 who ultimately placed 6th and 5th in the country respectively, as well as a world champion at the 2019 NSDA National Tournament in the World Schools Debate event, representing the North Coast (OH) district.

== Musical groups ==
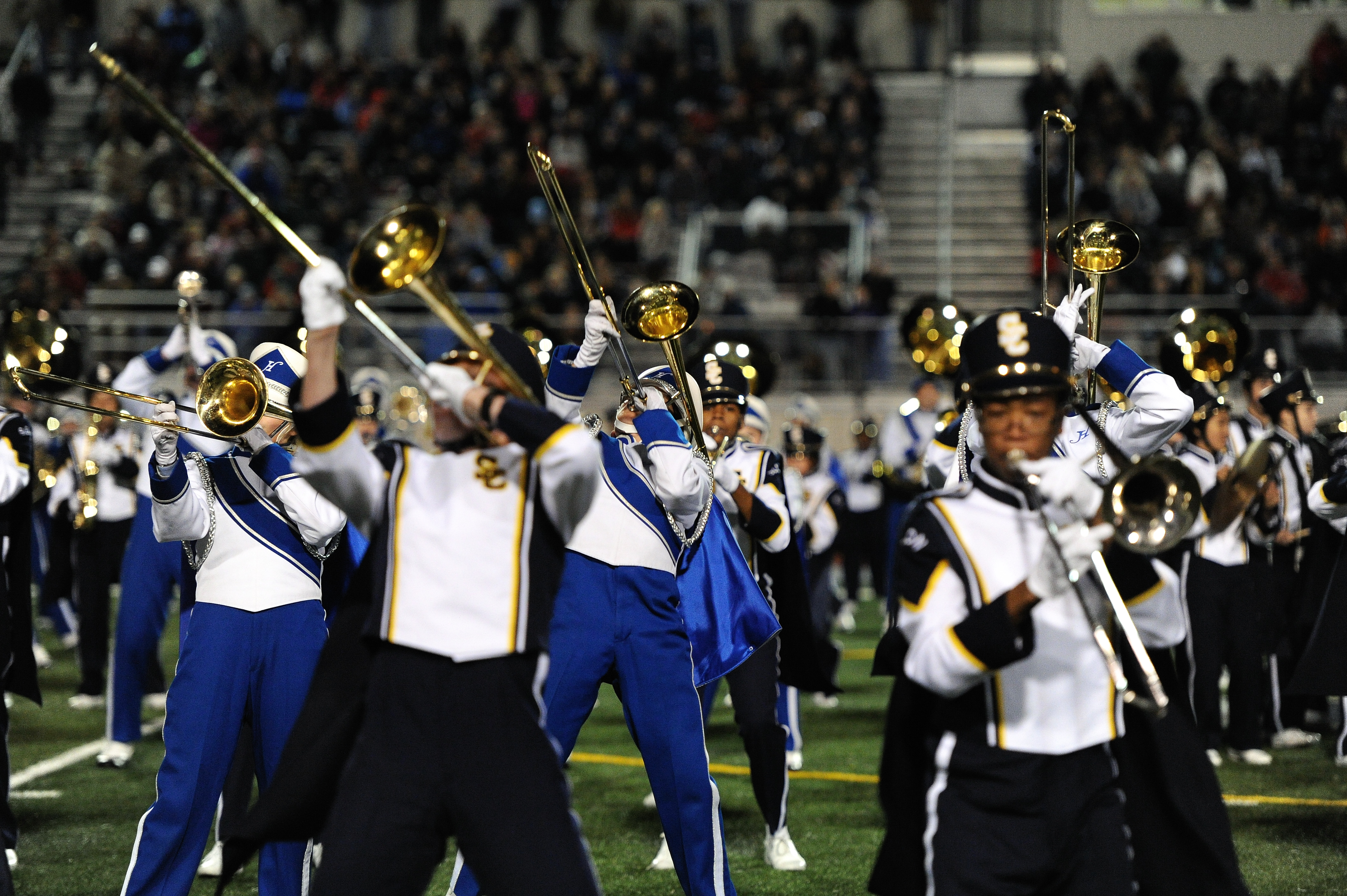
Solon High School Marching Band

=== Instrumental ensembles ===
Solon High School has robust band, orchestral, and choral programs. Some of the funds that these programs receive come from the school-associated non-profit organization the Solon Music Parents.

The school maintains a band program with over 300 students.

During the summer and fall, all students enrolled in the school's band course perform with the full marching band. The group hosts a "Band Bash" every year, during which local marching bands perform. The band has performed during halftime shows for the Cleveland Cavaliers and Cleveland Browns, as well as performed the national anthem for the Cleveland Indians pregame. There is a voluntary pep band that plays at school rallies and athletic events.

In the winter and spring, the band transitions to four concert bands, Wind Ensemble, Gold Ensemble, Blue Symphonic Band, and White Symphonic Band. All students must audition for the directors of the band. The Wind Ensemble is made up of the very top players often upperclass students, the Gold Ensemble is composed of the next most competitive players, and the rest of the students are evenly split by talent between the Blue and the White Symphonic bands. All members must participate in the Marching and Concert Band.

Solon currently has a jazz band for students to perform in, available by audition only. The Jazz band has traveled to New Orleans twice to learn about Jazz and the history of Jazz, and performed with jazz stars including Wayne Bergeron and Eddie Daniels.

The orchestra has approximately 180 students and is split into two orchestras: Sinfonia and Concert Orchestra. Students interested in playing in Sinfonia must audition. Often, a handful of band members will play with the Sinfonia at concerts. Concert Orchestra is the larger orchestra.

=== Choirs ===
There are five main choruses that comprise the Choral Program including: 9th Grade Women's (SSAA), 9th grade Men's Chorus (TTBB), Concert Choir (SATB), a cappella Choir (SATB), and Music in Motion (SATB). There are also extra-curricular ensembles such as "The Madrigals", and various female and male barbershop quartets formed by students.

Music in Motion is the Solon High School show choir. The group has won numerous Grand Championships in several Midwest competitions and had an undefeated season in 2012, and 2025. Solon transitioned in recent years from hosting a non-competition Festival to a full Show Choir Invitational.

== Media ==
The SHS Courier is the school newspaper which is written and edited by students.

Solon Education Television (SETV) is a local public access television station that is broadcast from the school. The Solon High School Club, Comet Productions, staffs all the events aired. The station currently airs original programming such as SHS graduation, sports, Solon Board meetings, band, choir, and orchestra concerts, the annual Honor Society talent show, and drama club productions.

Comet Productions is open to all students with an interest in video production, for sports, concerts, and musicals.

Solon Community Television was a local public-access television station that aired original programming and was broadcast from Solon High School SCTV Studio 1. Now, SCTV Studio 1 has been converted into a classroom for a communications course; the last broadcast from Studio 1 was in 2009.

== Notable alumni ==
=== Sports ===
- Chris Bando, MLB catcher
- Drew Carter, NFL wide receiver
- Roger Davis, NFL lineman
- Kim Herring, NFL safety
- Reginald Jagers III, Olympic discus thrower in the 2020 Tokyo Olympics and 2024 Paris Olympics
- Dallas Lauderdale, NCAA basketball player
- Jim Mandich, NFL tight end, sports radio talk show host
- Dave Meggyesy, NFL player, author, teacher, union organizer
- Mark Minor, NBA player
- Jeff Passan, MLB insider, ESPN, author

=== Music ===
- Michael Cartellone, current drummer for Lynyrd Skynyrd, former drummer for the Damn Yankees
- Dominick Farinacci, jazz trumpeter, composer, and big band leader
- Scott Mescudi (known by the stage name Kid Cudi), rapper, singer, record producer, and actor (did not graduate)

=== Other ===
- Abigail Hing Wen, author, film producer and director
- Jay Shendure, Professor of Genome Sciences at the University of Washington
- Marc Sumerak, freelance comic book writer, former writer and editor with Marvel Comics
- Jack Van Antwerp, Director of Photography with The Wall Street Journal

== Controversies ==
=== 2014 alleged sexting scandal ===
In 2014, Solon High School experienced allegations of sexting amongst students. School administrators said they found no evidence that these allegations were true.

=== Erin Short sexual grooming allegation ===
In March 2021, allegations surfaced of sexual relations between principal Erin Short and a former female student who graduated in 2005 The student, in a statement written to the Solon Police Department, claimed that Short began a "calculated cultivation of [an] inappropriate relationship" with her while she was still a student at Solon High School, detailing various acts of grooming directly by the principal. The statement went on to claim that Short pursued an intimate relationship that turned sexual after the young woman graduated. Short stated that the two had a relationship only after the former student was 19 years old and in college. Short was cleared of legal wrongdoing, and school administrators reinstated her employment after a period of paid administrative leave. She retired in August 2026.

=== Ed Kline Sexual Abuse accusations and convictions ===
As of August 2021, former district band director Ed Kline has been charged with 19 counts of gross sexual imposition, allegedly having sexually abused students as young as 12 for years. Kline had resigned in June 2018 and pled not guilty to the charges at his arraignment.

According to the indictment, the offenses took place from August 2003 until June 2014, describing Kline having "touched the breasts or buttocks of some victims" and "compelled others to touch his genitals". The grand jury referred to Kline as "a sexually violent predator" in the indictment statement.

In January 2022, Kline plead guilty to 10 counts of Gross Sexual Imposition, and 7 county of Sexual Imposition. In February 2022, he was sentenced to over 3 years in prison, and was ordered to register as a Sex Offender for 15 years. The court also ordered the forfeiture of his teaching license.
