= Fred A. Lennon =

American businessperson (1905–1998)

- Born: November 26, 1905; Providence, Rhode Island, U.S
- Died: July 23, 1998 (aged 92)
- Title: Founder and Chairman of Swagelok Company
- Spouse: Alice Lennon (d. 1995)
- Children: 2

Fred A. Lennon (November 26, 1905 – July 23, 1998) was an American industrial fittings manufacturer and philanthropist. He was the founder and chairman of Swagelok Company.

Known for avoiding attention, Forbes magazine once described him as "the shiest billionaire".

== Early life and career ==
Fred Lennon was born in Providence, Rhode Island, to Patrick and Catherine Lennon, as the youngest of their nine children. By the age of 42, he was living with his wife in an apartment in Cleveland, Ohio, when he borrowed US $500 from his wife's uncle to buy The Crawford Fitting Company, later renamed the Swagelok Company. Running the small business from his kitchen, he bought out his partner, Cullen B. Crawford and U.S. patent 3,075,793 for the Swagelok Tube Fitting, a revolutionary two-ferrule compression-type fitting for fluid handling systems.

== Business leadership ==
Moving the company to Solon, Ohio, it steadily expanded into a large, international manufacturing corporation. Under Lennon's leadership, Swagelok gradually became a Fortune 500 Privately Held Company, producing thousands of products, and holding over US$1 billion in assets and employing a staff of 3,000. In leading the company for over 50 years, Lennon never missed a day of work.

As part of Swagelok's 50th Anniversary in 1997, Lennon rented out the Rock n Roll Hall of Fame and Science Center for all Swagelok employees and their families.

== Personal life ==
Lennon was an enthusiastic supporter of private business interests and an active member and donor to the Republican Party. He counted among his personal friends former President Ronald Reagan and former Ohio Governor George Voinovich (he helped both with their election campaigns). Though playing a public role, he preferred to stay a private man, generally preferring to stay out of the limelight whenever possible. He lived with his wife, Alice, and their two children in Hunting Valley, Ohio.

== Philanthropy ==
Lennon was active in, and contributed to, a variety of charitable and nonprofit organizations in Ohio. He was a founder and chairman of The Ashbrook Center for Public Affairs at Ashland University, and president of Gilmour Academy in Gates Mills. He created the Fred A. Lennon Foundation, which between its establishment in 1965 and its dissolution in 1995, donated millions to a variety of schools, nonprofit foundations and charities. Following his death in 1998, The Fred A. Lennon Charitable Trust was created to honor him posthumously, and has continued to fund and assist schools and charities in the region.
