= Solon, Ohio =

- City
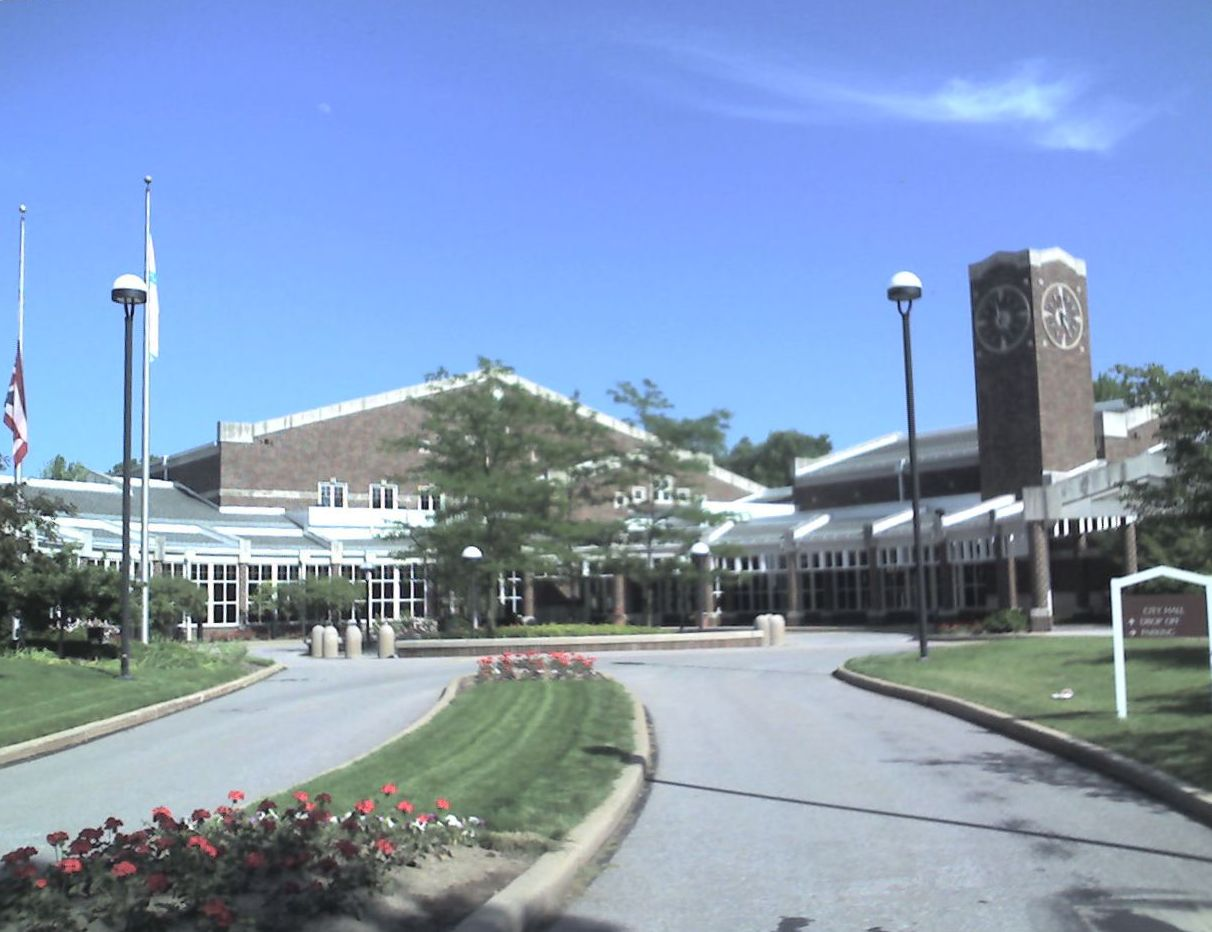
- Solon City Hall

- Flag Logo
- Interactive map of Solon, Ohio
- Location within Ohio Location within the United States
- Coordinates: 41°23′N 81°27′W
- Country: United States
- State: Ohio
- County: Cuyahoga

Government
  - Mayor: Edward H. Kraus (D)
  - Vice Mayor: Nancy Meany (D)

Area
  - Total: 20.43 sq mi (52.91 km^{2})
  - Land: 20.31 sq mi (52.61 km^{2})
  - Water: 0.12 sq mi (0.30 km^{2})
- Elevation: 1,040 ft (320 m)

Population (2020)
  - Total: 24,262
  - Density: 1,194.4/sq mi (461.15/km^{2})
- Time zone: UTC-5 (Eastern (EST))
  - Summer (DST): UTC-4 (EDT)
- ZIP code: 44139
- Area code: 440
- FIPS code: 39-72928
- GNIS feature ID: 1046426
- Website: https://www.solonohio.gov/

Solon (/ˈsoʊlən/ SOH-lun) is a city in southeastern Cuyahoga County, Ohio, United States. The population was 24,262 at the 2020 census. A suburb of Cleveland, it is part of the Cleveland metropolitan area.

== History ==
In 1820, the first settlers arrived from Connecticut to live in part of the Connecticut Western Reserve. The township was named after Lorenzo Solon Bull, who was the son of Isaac Bull, one of the first settlers. Purportedly, the selection of young Lorenzo's middle name was due to its derivation from the "father of democracy", Solon, the lawmaker of Ancient Greece. The early settlers faced challenges common to pioneers, but in Solon, drainage and wetlands issues complicated settlement and agriculture. Overcoming these obstacles, Solon Township became an arable farming area, producing corn and wheat crops and supporting dairy farm] (including five cheese factories). By 1850, the population of Solon Township reached 1,034.

Because of nearby Cleveland's position as a national hub of the railroad industry, rail also contributed greatly to Solon's growth. In 1857, the Cleveland-Youngstown section of the Cleveland and Mahoning Railroad established a line running through Solon.

Laid out in a traditional New England plan, Solon, like many of the neighboring townships, established a public square in its town center. In conjunction with townships to the north, a north–south corridor was established through the town centers of Solon, Orange, and Mayfield townships (from south to north, respectively) and, accordingly, was named SOM Center Road (now Ohio 91). Solon Township included the current municipalities of the City of Solon and the villages of Bentleyville and Glenwillow. In 1927, Solon was incorporated as a village and later became a city in 1961, operated under the mayor-council form of government.

Solon was one of the first cities to use a comprehensive zoning plan and has been able to achieve a strong industrial base, while insulating its bedroom communities from industrial activities. Further, the city has primarily concentrated its commercial and retail districts in the town center, making them convenient to all residents. In addition to its planned use for corporate and residential areas, Solon has 687 acres (2.78 km^{2}) of city parks and recreational area, 360 acres (1.5 km^{2}) of Cleveland Metroparks (the South Chagrin Reservation) and three golf courses within its borders.

In 1991, the extension of a divided highway, US 422, was completed as an east–west corridor just north of its town center. US 422 enables easy access to many points throughout Northeast Ohio, providing a corridor extending from Cleveland through Solon and beyond Warren into Pennsylvania.

== Geography ==
Solon

Climate chart (precipitation, max. and min. temperature)
J	F	M	A	M	J	J	A	S	O	N	D
3 31 15	2.6 35 17	3.2 44 24	3.7 58 36	4.2 68 46	4 77 55	4 80 59	3.6 79 58	3.8 72 51	3.5 60 40	3.7 48 31	3.5 36 20
- █ Average max. and min. temperatures in °F
- █ Precipitation totals in inches
- Source: The Weather Channel
Metric conversion
J	F	M	A	M	J	J	A	S	O	N	D
76 −1 −9	66 2 −8	82 7 −4	94 14 2	106 20 8	102 25 13	103 27 15	92 26 14	95 22 11	88 16 4	93 9 −1	89 2 −7
- █ Average max. and min. temperatures in °C
- █ Precipitation totals in mm

According to the United States Census Bureau, the city has a total area of 20.49 square miles (53.07 km^{2}), of which 20.36 square miles (52.73 km^{2}) is land and 0.13 square miles (0.34 km^{2}) is water.

=== Climate ===
Solon lies in a humid continental climate zone (Köppen Dfa) and has four distinct seasons, from hot summers to cold and snowy winters. The highest recorded temperature in the city was 101 °F (38 °C) in 1918, and the lowest was −25 °F (−32 °C) in 1994.

Solon experiences relatively high precipitation (an average of 42.78 inches (1,087 mm) annually) due to lake effect and its presence on the western end of the North American snowbelt.

== Demographics ==
Historical population
Census	Pop.	Note	%±
1920	887		—
1930	1,027		15.8%
1940	1,508		46.8%
1950	2,570		70.4%
1960	6,333		146.4%
1970	11,519		81.9%
1980	13,950		21.1%
1990	18,548		33.0%
2000	21,802		17.5%
2010	23,348		7.1%
2020	24,262		3.9%

As of 2010, the median income for a household in the city was $96,965, and the median income for a family was $112,156. The per capita income for the city was $47,505. About 2.0% of families and 4.8% of the population were below the poverty line.

Of the city's population over age 25, 57.0% hold a bachelor's degree or higher.

Solon has a large immigrant population. The diversity of its population is cited as one reason for the success of Solon's school district.

Over a dozen churches and synagogues are found within the city limits.

=== Racial and ethnic composition ===
Solon city, Ohio – Racial and ethnic composition Note: the US Census treats Hispanic/Latino as an ethnic category. This table excludes Latinos from the racial categories and assigns them to a separate category. Hispanics/Latinos may be of any race.
Race / Ethnicity (NH = Non-Hispanic)	Pop 2000	Pop 2010	Pop 2020	% 2000	% 2010	% 2020
White alone (NH)	19,046	17,867	15,865	87.36%	76.52%	65.39%
Black or African American alone (NH)	1,319	2,441	2,819	6.05%	10.45%	11.62%
Native American or Alaska Native alone (NH)	8	8	24	0.04%	0.03%	0.10%
Asian alone (NH)	1,067	2,336	4,001	4.89%	10.01%	16.49%
Native Hawaiian or Pacific Islander alone (NH)	2	3	3	0.01%	0.01%	0.01%
Other race alone (NH)	15	51	86	0.07%	0.22%	0.35%
Mixed race or Multiracial (NH)	192	285	871	0.88%	1.22%	3.59%
Hispanic or Latino (any race)	153	357	593	0.70%	1.53%	2.44%
Total	21,802	23,348	24,262	100.00%	100.00%	100.00%

=== 2020 census ===
As of the 2020 census, Solon had a population of 24,262. The median age was 43.4 years. 24.7% of residents were under the age of 18 and 18.9% of residents were 65 years of age or older. For every 100 females there were 94.8 males, and for every 100 females age 18 and over there were 92.3 males age 18 and over.

98.7% of residents lived in urban areas, while 1.3% lived in rural areas.

There were 8,791 households in Solon, of which 38.8% had children under the age of 18 living in them. Of all households, 66.0% were married-couple households, 11.2% were households with a male householder and no spouse or partner present, and 19.8% were households with a female householder and no spouse or partner present. About 18.6% of all households were made up of individuals and 10.6% had someone living alone who was 65 years of age or older.

There were 9,079 housing units, of which 3.2% were vacant. The homeowner vacancy rate was 0.9% and the rental vacancy rate was 4.1%.

Racial composition as of the 2020 census
Race	Number	Percent
White	15,976	65.8%
Black or African American	2,867	11.8%
American Indian and Alaska Native	28	0.1%
Asian	4,007	16.5%
Native Hawaiian and Other Pacific Islander	5	0.0%
Some other race	205	0.8%
Two or more races	1,174	4.8%
Hispanic or Latino (of any race)	593	2.4%

=== 2010 census ===
As of the census of 2010, there were 23,348 people, 8,352 households, and 6,769 families residing in the city. The population density was 1,146.8 inhabitants per square mile (442.8/km^{2}). There were 8,765 housing units at an average density of 430.5 per square mile (166.2/km^{2}). The racial makeup of the city was 77.5% White, 10.9% Asian, 0.1% Native American, 9.8% African American, 0.4% from other races, and 1.4% from two or more races. Hispanic or Latino of any race were 1.5% of the population.

There were 8,352 households, of which 41.5% had children under age 18 living with them, 68.7% were married couples living together, 9.4% had a female householder with no husband present, 2.9% had a male householder with no wife present, and 19.0% were non-families. 16.6% of all households were made up of individuals, and 7.2% had someone living alone who was 65 years of age or older. The average household size was 2.78 and the average family size was 3.13.

The median age in the city was 43.1 years. 27.8% of residents were under 18; 5.2% were between 18 and 24; 20.3% were from 25 to 44; 34.3% were from 45 to 64; and 12.4% were 65 or older. The gender makeup of the city was 48.7% male and 51.3% female.

=== 2000 census ===
In 2000, 90.8% spoke English, 1.9% Russian, 1.4% Chinese, 1.1% Spanish, and 0.8% German.

== Economy ==
In 1929, the Bready Cultimotor tractor company became the first industrial company to locate in Solon. Since then, Solon has served as home to many multinational companies, including several global and North American headquarters. Although Solon is a suburb of Cleveland, it has an employment base sufficient to support its residential population and thus should not be considered a bedroom community.

Today, according to city government authorities, Solon has major clusters of businesses in five manufacturing industries: electronic and electrical equipment, industrial and commercial machinery, measuring and controlling devices and instruments, chemicals and allied products, and fabricated metal products. Over 8,000, or 75%, of Solon's 10,700 manufacturing jobs are concentrated in these five sectors.

Major employers include: Nestlé Prepared Foods (formerly Stouffer Corporation), Swagelok, Pentair, Signature of Solon Country Club, Keithley Instruments and Arrow Electronics. There is a branch of the Cleveland Clinic here as well.

The Robbins Company, a leading international manufacturer of tunnel boring machines founded in 1952, is headquartered in Solon. Robbins employs over 150 individuals in the city and has produced a number of industry innovations.

=== Top employers ===
According to Solon's 2017 Comprehensive Annual Financial Report, the top employers in the city are:

#	Employer	# of Employees
1	Swagelok Company	3,255
2	Nestle Food Company	1,946
3	Cleveland Clinic Foundation	997
4	National Enterprise Systems	932
5	City of Solon	875
6	CVS Caremark	719
7	Solon City School District	676
8	nVent Electric	617
9	MRI Software	468
10	Kennametal	346

== Arts and culture ==
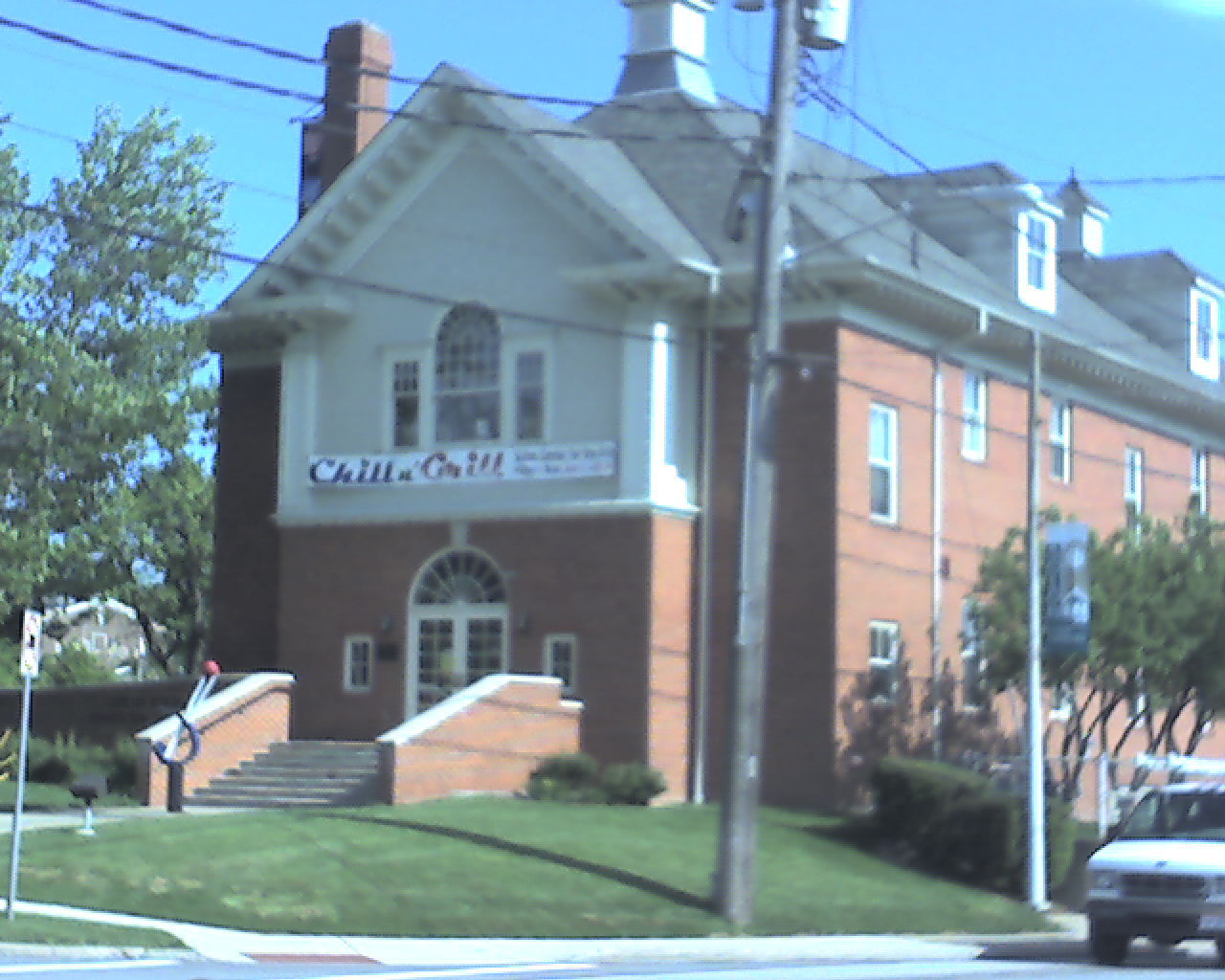
The Solon Center for the Arts is located in the historic Old City Hall, constructed in 1899.

=== Performing arts ===
The Solon Center for the Arts offers classes in art, music, dance, and theater. The center holds a program for seniors entitled "Act II: Aging Creatively through the Arts," for those over 55 interested in theater or music.

The city is also home to the Solon Philharmonic Orchestra, and hosts an annual Young Artists Concerto Competition.

=== Historical society ===
Established in 1968 in the old Disciple Church, the Solon Historical Society maintains a museum with artifacts from the 1800s through the 1900s, many of which serve as memorials to the city founders. Many pieces in the museum include antique household and kitchen items, antique furniture, Solon Springs soda bottles, antique children's toys, school desks from the old school house, and many others. The museum is opened the second Sunday of every month.

== Education ==
=== Solon City Schools ===
The majority of students from Solon and the neighboring village of Glenwillow are educated through the Solon City School District. The district has been consistently ranked as a top 10 school district in the state of Ohio, as well as receiving praise from publications such as Newsweek, and U.S. News & World Report. Solon Schools have also received honors such as the Red Quill and Red Quill Legacy awards for multiple years in a row from the ACT organization. Solon Schools have also received the National Blue Ribbon School recognition, considered to be one of the highest honors for American schools, many times over the past few decades. In 2017, Niche.com ranked the school district the best in the United States.

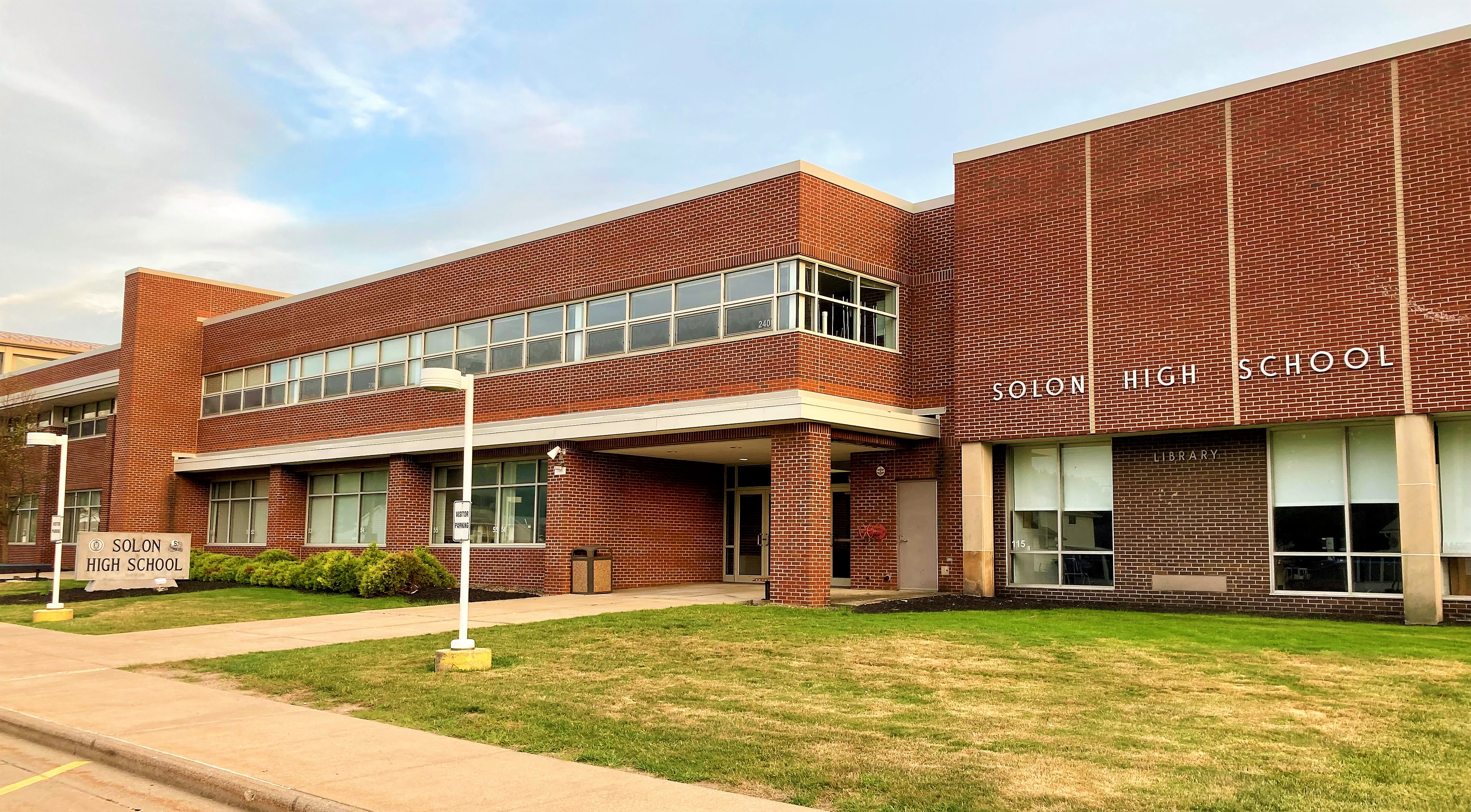
Solon High School

Solon High School educates approximately 1,600–1,700 students per school year, Solon Middle School and Orchard Middle School educate 700–900 students per school year each, and each elementary school educates 400–600 students per year, putting the district enrollment at approximately 4,700–5,000 students per school year.

The district contains six schools serving grades K–12 and one preschool:

- Solon High School (9–12)
- Solon Middle School (7–8)
- Orchard Middle School (5–6)
- Lewis Elementary School (K–4)
- Parkside Elementary School (K–4)
- Roxbury Elementary School (K–4)
- Joseph V. Regano Early Learning Center (Preschool)

The former Arthur Road Elementary School, which closed following the 2015–2016 school year, served as a public preschool and administrative building before being demolished in 2022.

=== Private schools ===
St. Rita School is a private Catholic religious institution, associated with the St. Rita Roman Catholic Parish Church in Solon. The school offers preschool, elementary, upper elementary, and middle school programs. St. Rita School has also received National Blue Ribbon School designation from the United States government.

== Infrastructure ==
=== Police department ===
As of 2014, the Solon Police Department consisted of 46 officers, 14 dispatchers, 16 correction officers, eight office staff, one animal warden, 19 auxiliary police, and six school guards.

Additionally In 2025, the notable sidearms used by the Solon police department include the Smith and Wesson M&P model 2.0 19 x 9mm, Glock Model 45 and for primary arms the police department uses Remington 870 shotguns and the Smith and Wesson M&P 15 duty rifles.

== Notable people ==
- Steve Dettelbach (born 1965), former director of the Bureau of Alcohol, Tobacco, and Firearms, former U.S. Attorney for the Northern District of Ohio
- Michael Lerner (1941–2023), actor
- Georgia T. Robertson (1852–1916), educator and author
- Phil Robinson (born 1980), state representative from Ohio's 19th district
- Michael Grepp (born 1985), actor and musician
- Evelyn Svec Ward (1921–1989), American fiber artist
- Elizabeth Lowe Watson (1842–1927), lecturer; religious and suffrage leader
