= Frank Jirouch =

American sculptor

- Born: March 3, 1878; Cleveland, Ohio, United States
- Died: May 2, 1970 (aged 92); Cleveland, Ohio, United States
- Occupation: Sculptor

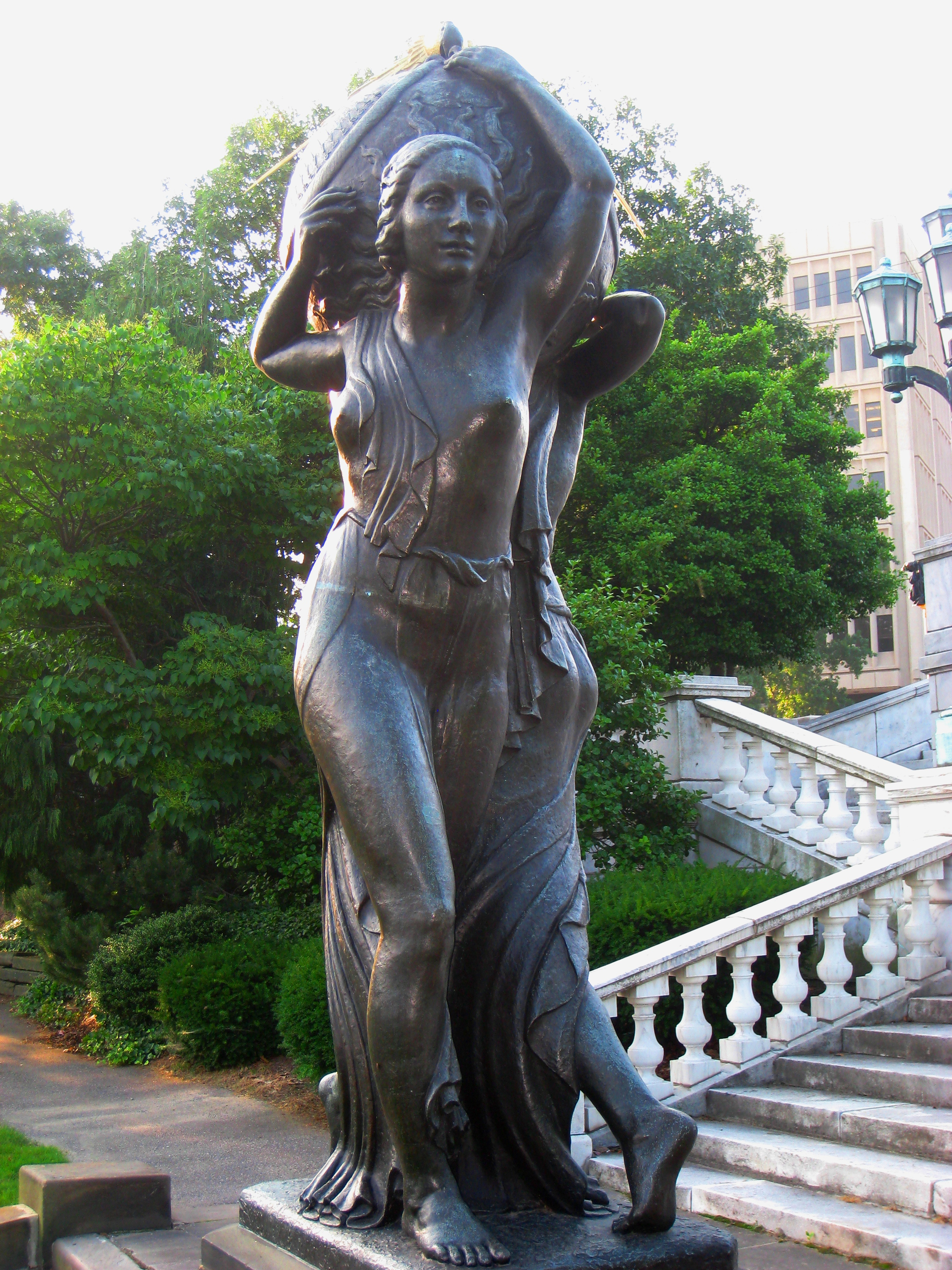
"Night Passing Earth to Day" in Wade Park

Frank Jirouch (March 3, 1878 – May 2, 1970) was an American sculptor. His work was part of the sculpture event in the art competition at the 1932 Summer Olympics.

Born to Czech immigrant parents, he lived in the Hiram House neighborhood that was later razed for the Northern Ohio Food Terminal and attended Fowler School in the Broadway neighborhood. After leaving school he began his career working at the White Sewing Machine Company. He got into wood carving and established Fisher and Jirouch Co. with George J. Fischer. It was on Superior Avenue in Cleveland.

He made busts for Cleveland Cultural Gardens.

== See also ==
- Susanna Louise Patteson
