= Rockefeller Park =

- Rockefeller Park Bridges
- U.S. National Register of Historic Places
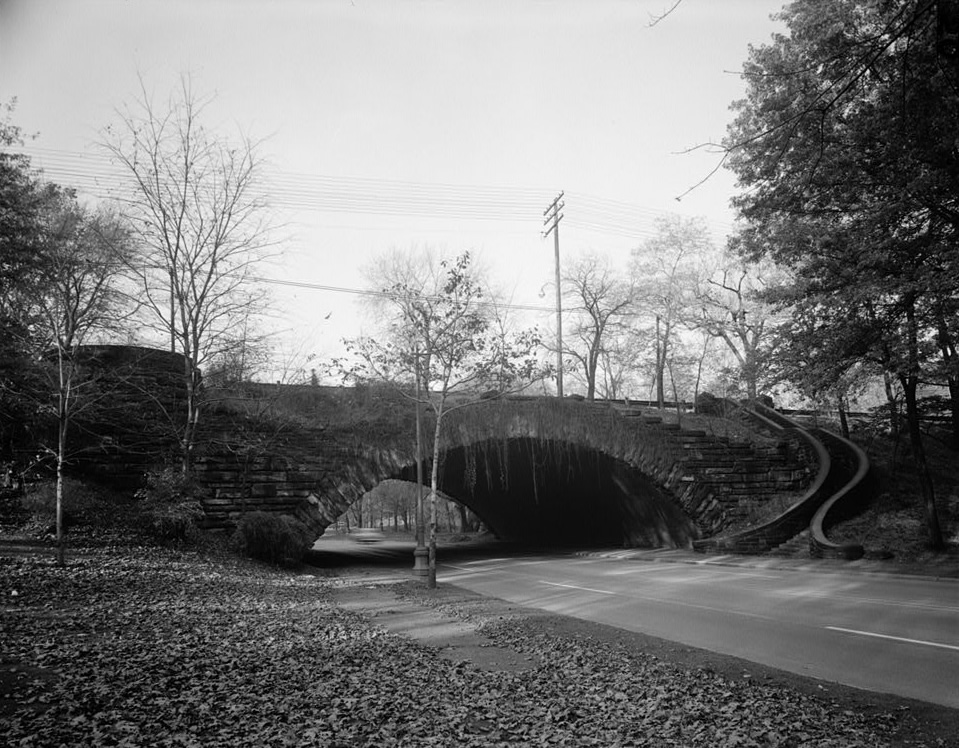
- The Wade Park Avenue bridge (est. 1896) is one of four historic stone bridges found along the historic wooded parkway.

- Location within Ohio Location within the United States
- Location: Rockefeller Park, along Martin Luther King Jr. Drive at Wade Park Ave., Superior Ave., St.Clair and the Conrail tracks adjacent the Cleveland Memorial Shoreway; Cleveland, Ohio 44108
- Coordinates: 41°31′30″N 81°37′22″W
- Area: 130 acres (0.53 km^{2})
- Built: 1896-1900
- Architect: Charles F. Schweinfurth
- NRHP reference No.: 77001051
- Added to NRHP: 1977

Rockefeller Park is a city park named in honor of oil magnate John D. Rockefeller Sr., located in Cleveland, Ohio. Part of the Cleveland Public Parks District, Rockefeller Park is immediately adjacent Wade Park to the southeast, and across Euclid Ave on its northwest border. Besides the distinction of being the largest park located completely within city limits, Rockefeller Park is a link in a chain of parkland that connects the heights region of the eastern suburbs to the city's lakefront. Following the path of Martin Luther King Jr. Drive and spanning a large section of Cleveland's East Sides, the park runs in a northwesterly path between suburban Shaker Heights, bisecting the University Circle neighborhood and terminating at Gordon Park on the city's lakefront, opened to the public in 1897. The park was dramatically expanded during the 1930s with labor provided by the Works Progress Administration. Landmarks found in Rockefeller Park include two separate entries on the National Register of Historic Places: one for its architecturally historic bridges, and one for its Cultural Gardens.

== Points of interest ==
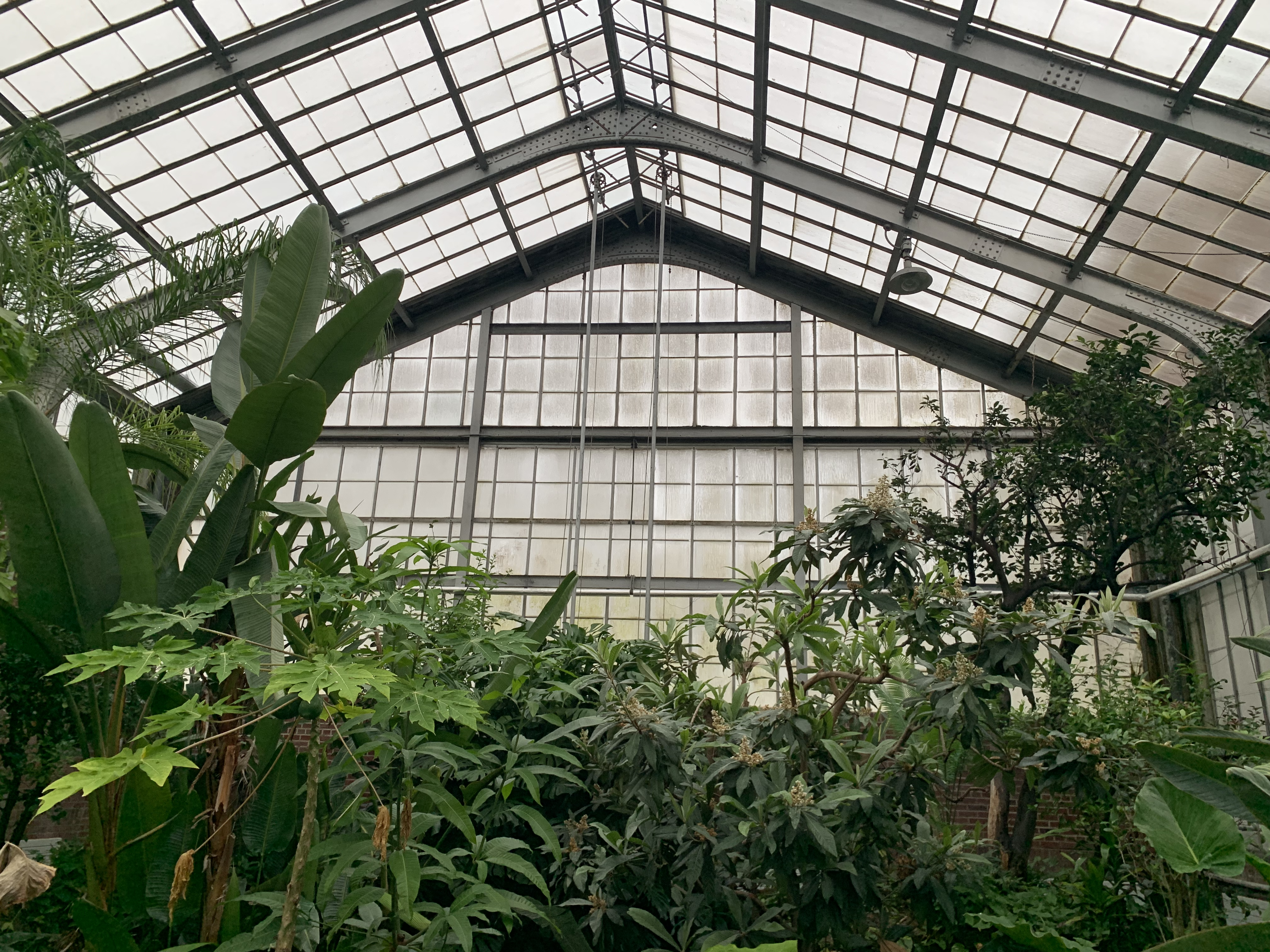
View inside greenhouse

- Cleveland Cultural Gardens - one of the two places in the park listed on the National Register of Historic Places, the Cultural Gardens commemorate many of the ethnic groups who have enriched the city of Cleveland and the United States.
- Doan Brook - a seven-mile (11 km)-long stream that runs from the suburban Shaker Lakes to Lake Erie, the brook was an essential feature in the establishment of the routing of the park.
- Rockefeller Park Bridges - the four stone bridges over Martin Luther King Jr. Boulevard are the other location in the park on the National Register of Historic Places. They were designed by architect Charles F. Schweinfurth and built between 1897 and 1900.
- Rockefeller Park Greenhouse - located at the northeastern edge of the park between Martin Luther King Jr. Boulevard and East 88th Street, the greenhouse and its gardens occupy four acres (1.6 ha) and opened in 1905.
