= Cleveland Public Parks District =

Park district in Ohio, United States

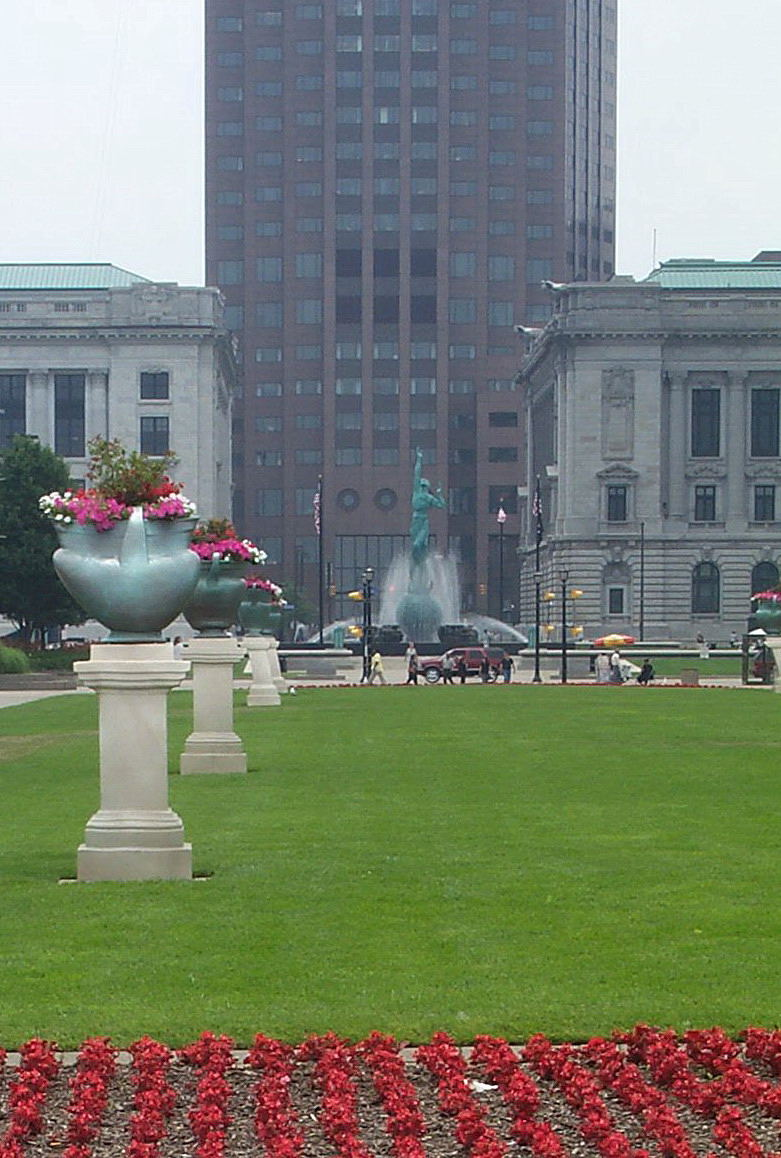
The Mall.

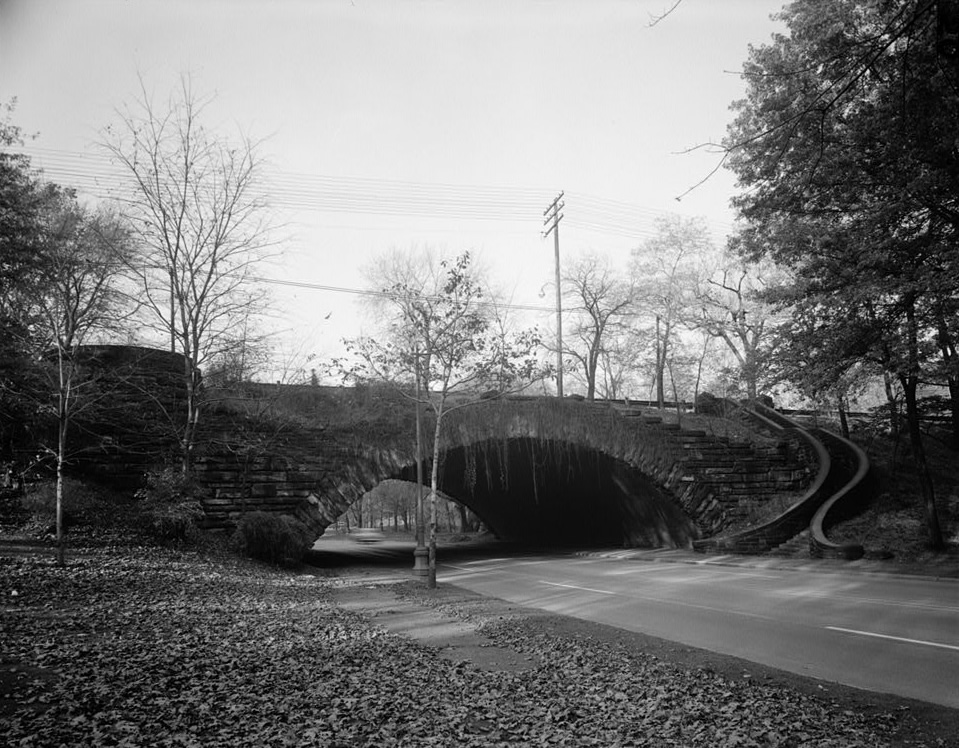
Rockefeller Park, the largest park in Cleveland.

The Cleveland Public Parks District is a division of the city's Department of Public Works, which is responsible for park maintenance in the City of Cleveland, Ohio. The following is a comprehensive list of the city's more than 150 public parks.

== Notable parks ==
- Gordon Park (E. 72nd, S. of Shoreway 46.00 acres (18.62 ha) - Located on the lakefront, a section of Gordon Park is part of the Cleveland Lakefront State Park system.
- The Mall - Part of the 1903 Group Plan, which was part of an architectural collaboration headed by Daniel Burnham, the Mall is an historic site divided into three sections, and is located north of Public Square.
  - Mall A (Memorial Plaza, West Mall Dr. at St. Clair Av. 2.75 acres (1.11 ha)
  - Mall B (Hanna Plaza, F.Pastorius Blvd.@ Lakeside Av.5.45 acres (2.21 ha)
  - Mall C (Strawbridge Plaza, 301 Lakeside Av. 5.46 acres (2.21 ha)
- Rockefeller Park (9601 Wade Park Ave 130.00 acres (52.61 ha) - The city's largest park, built on land that was donated to the city by local Cleveland philanthropist and industrialist, John D. Rockefeller.
  - Rockefeller Park Greenhouse 750 E. 88th St.
  - Rockefeller Park Lagoon

== Other parks ==
- Abbey Park - Abbey Ave. and West 19th 4.45 acres (1.80 ha)
- Ambler Park - MLK Jr Blvd., N. of Fairhill Rd. 52.44 acres (21.22 ha)
- Ambler-Holton Playground - W. of Woodhill S. of Buckeye Rd. 0.94 acres (0.38 ha)
- Archmere Park - W. 41st & Archmere Av. 4.04 acres (1.63 ha)
- Artha Woods Park - MLK Jr. Blvd. & Woodstock Av. 6.08 acres (2.46 ha)
- W. 108th & Baltic Ave. 1.20 acres (0.49 ha)
- Barkwill Playground - E. 53rd & Barkwill Av. 1.29 acres (0.52 ha)
- Belmont Park -W. 114th, N. of Lorain Av. 1.12 acres (0.45 ha)
- Beman Playground - S. of Harvard Av. & E. 78th 8.25 acres (3.34 ha)
- Briggs Playfield Briggs Av. & W. 106th 0.55 acres (0.22 ha)
- Brookfield Park W. 125th, S. of I-71 3.03 acres (1.23 ha)
- Brookside Park Fulton Rd. & Denison Av. 111.34 acres (45.06 ha)
- Buckeye Mini Park -E. 118th & Buckeye Rd. 0.15 acres (0.061 ha)
- Calgary Park- W. 23rd, S. of Denison Av. 5.24 acres (2.12 ha)
- Carol McClendon Park -E. 98th, S. of Union Av. 2.79 acres (1.13 ha)
- Carrie Cain Playground- E. 79th & Sowinski Av. 1.29 acres (0.52 ha)
- Cleveland Skatepark -1 Key Plaza 0.25 acres (0.10 ha) 1 2 North Coast Harbor behind Rock Hall
- Coit Park -St. Clair Av. & Coit Rd. 1.57 acres (0.64 ha)
- Collinwood Athletic Complex- 1070 East 152nd 8.50 acres (3.44 ha)
- Colonel Chas. Young Square -E. 46th & Prospect Av. 0.40 acres (0.16 ha) Median Pk, Cleveland Landmark
- Crawford Park -East Blvd, S. of Miles Av. 21.50 acres (8.70 ha)
- Crossburn Park -Crossburn Av., W. of W. 130th 5.28 acres (2.14 ha)
- Dan Kane Gardens- Kenyon Av. & E. 65th 0.50 acres (0.20 ha)
- Davinwood Park- W. 191st, N. of Puritas Av. 5.00 acres (2.02 ha)
- Dell Playground- E. 75th, S. of Woodland Av. 1.30 acres (0.53 ha)
- Dove Park - E. 102nd, N. of Harvard Av. 4.17 acres (1.69 ha)
- Drake Tot Lot - E. 68th, S. of Woodland Av. 0.07 acres (0.028 ha)
- Drakefield Park- W. 157th, S. of Lorain Av. 5.67 acres (2.29 ha)
- Duggan Park- Catalpa Rd., N. of Euclid Av. 8.70 acres (3.52 ha)
- East 110th & Harvard Park -E. 110th & Harvard Av. 2.99 acres (1.21 ha)
- East 69th & Central Playground- E. 69th & Central Av. 0.24 acres (0.097 ha)
- East 9th/Rockwell Park- E. 9th St. & Rockwell Av. 0.09 acres (0.036 ha)
- Easton Park- E. 88th, S. of Kinsman Rd. 2.96 acres (1.20 ha)
- Eberhard Playground- E. 90th, S. of Buckeye Rd. 2.60 acres (1.05 ha)
- Emery Park - W. 130th, S. of I-71 11.31 acres (4.58 ha)
- Emery-Alexco Playfield 0Emery Av., N. of I-71 3.89 acres (1.57 ha)
- Endora Playfield -SE of Euclid & Colonial Hts. Dr. 45.57 acres (18.44 ha)
- Fairview Park- W. 38th & Franklin Av. 5.42 acres (2.19 ha)
- Flora Park- E. 103rd, S. of St. Clair Av. 0.60 acres (0.24 ha)
- Forest City Park -Kimmel Rd., off Independence Rd 0.36 acres (0.15 ha)
- Forest Hills Park- Thornhill Rd. S.of Arlington Av. 14.00 acres (5.67 ha)
- Frank Novak Park -Fulton Rd. & Lorain Av. 0.43 acres (0.17 ha)
- Frederick Douglass Park-E. 154th & Miles Av. 38.00 acres (15.38 ha)
- Gardenview Hill in Rockefeller Park -8700 St. Clair Av. 6 8
- Gassaway Pool- E. 100th, N. of Quebec Av. 0.42 acres (0.17 ha)
- Gawron Park- E. 136th 2.99 acres (1.21 ha)
- Gay & E. 104th Gardens- E. 104th & Gay Av. 2.23 acres (0.90 ha)
- George/Jennings Park- 1009 Ansel Road 0.34 acres (0.14 ha)
- Gilmore Park -W. 134th & Puritas Av. 5.95 acres (2.41 ha)
- Glendale Park- E. 149th, N. of Harvard Av. 5.06 acres (2.05 ha)
- Glenview Park- Dupont Av. & E. 108th 26.00 acres (10.52 ha)
- Goudreau Park - W. 14th, S. of Cook Av. 4.60 acres (1.86 ha)
- Grant Playground- E. 38th, N. of Central Av. 1.14 acres (0.46 ha)
- Grdina Park- E. 61st, N. of St. Clair Av. 2.20 acres (0.89 ha)
- Greenwood Park -W. 38th, S. of Lorain Rd. 1.42 acres (0.57 ha)
- Groton Park -Groton Rd., S. of Green Rd. 2.25 acres (0.91 ha)
- Grovewood Pool -E. 164th & Grovewood Av. 1.92 acres (0.78 ha)
- Halloran Park -3550 W. 117th St. 18.83 acres (7.62 ha)
- Harding Playground- Broadway Av., E. of I-77 0.73 acres (0.30 ha)
- Harmody Park- Plymouth Rd. & So. Hills Blvd. 20.00 acres (8.09 ha)
- Harold T. Clark Tennis Courts- E. 23rd & Shoreway 8.80 acres (3.56 ha)
- Helen Simpson Park -S. Moreland Blvd. & Buckeye Rd. 0.79 acres (0.32 ha)
- Henritze Park- Henritze Av. & W. 37th 0.22 acres (0.089 ha)
- Heritage Park 1 -(east bank) Merwin St. at West Av. 0.63 acres (0.25 ha) Opened in 1976, the park is the site of a replica of Lorenzo Carter's cabin, the first permanent non-indigenous settler in what would become Cleveland.
- Heritage Park 2- (west bank) Riverbed Rd. at Elm St. 0.53 acres (0.21 ha)
- Herman Park -W. 60th & Herman Av. 2.42 acres (0.98 ha)
- Hughes Playground -W. of Broadway & Miles Aves. 0.40 acres (0.16 ha)
- Humphrey Park -E. 161st & Grovewood Av. 26.18 acres (10.59 ha)
- Hyacinth Park- Waterman Av. & E. 65th 4.00 acres (1.62 ha)
- Idalia Park -E. 176th & Deforest Av. 6.87 acres (2.78 ha)
- Impett Park- W. 155th & Montrose Av. 34.82 acres (14.09 ha)
- Irma Park- E. 74th & Irma Av. 3 12 0.49 acres (0.20 ha)
- James Bell Pool- E. 71st & Central Av. 0.51 acres (0.21 ha)
- James M. Dunphy Park- West Blvd. & Jasper Rd. 14.32 acres (1.75 ha)
- Jefferson Park- W. 132nd & Lorain Av. 12.00 acres (4.86 ha)
- Jimmy Bivens Park -W. 25th & Detroit Av. 0.47 acres (0.19 ha)
- Jo Ann Park -E. 183rd, N. of Harvard Av. 8.04 acres (3.25 ha)
- Kerruish Park- E. 170th & Tarkington Av. 76.00 acres (30.76 ha)
- Kirtland Park -E. 49th & Shoreway 13.00 acres (5.26 ha)
- Kossuth Park- E. 121st & Shaker Blvd. 0.45 acres (0.18 ha)
- Lake Park -W. 85th, N. of Detroit Av. 1.00 acre (0.40 ha)
- Lawn-Madison Park -W. 73rd & Madison Av. 1.30 acres (0.53 ha)
- League Park - E. 66th & Lexington Av. 6.96 acres (2.82 ha) Cleveland Landmark
- Lincoln Park -W. 14th & Starkweather Av. 7.55 acres (3.06 ha)
- Loew Park -4711 West 32nd St. 23.11 acres (9.35 ha)
- Longfellow Playground - E. 59th & Longfellow Av. 0.40 acres (0.16 ha)
- Luke Easter Park -MLK Jr Blvd. & Ramona Blvd.116.36 acres (47.09 ha)
- Maplewood Park -18026 Cleveland Parkway 16.0 acres (6.5 ha)
- Marion Motley Playfield- E. 73rd & Carson Av. 25.91 acres (10.49 ha)
- Mark Tromba Park- Mandalay & Rudyard. 3.36 acres (1.36 ha)
- Mark Tromba Park- Mandalay & Rudyard. 2.93 acres (1.19 ha)
- Market Square Park- West 25th St. & Lorain Av. 0.33 acres (0.13 ha)
- Martin Luther King Jr. Park- E. 107th & Elk Av.1.66 acres (0.67 ha)
- Memphis School Site- 4103 Memphis Av. 2.48 acres (1.00 ha)
- Mercedes Cotner Park- W. 95th, S. of Denison Av. 5.35 acres (2.17 ha)
- Meyer Pool- W. 30th & Meyer Av.0.71 acres (0.29 ha)
- Miles Heights Park -Seville Av. & E. 147th7.70 acres (3.12 ha)
- Mohican Park- W. 135th & Triskett Rd. 24.70 acres (10.00 ha)
- Morgan Playground -E. 88th, N. of Wade Park Av. 1.50 acres (0.61 ha)
- Morgana Park -E. 65th, S. of Broadway Av. 6.43 acres (2.60 ha)
- Moulton/Scoutway Park- E. 115th & Moulton Av. 4.15 acres (1.68 ha)
- Munn Park- Munn Rd. at W. 165th 2.30 acres (0.93 ha)
- Neff Park -E. 193rd & Bella Dr. 7.77 acres (3.14 ha)
- Norman Play Lot -Norman Av. & E. 105th 0.36 acres (0.15 ha)
- North Collinwood Town Center- Lakeshore Blvd. @ E. 174th 1.26 acres (0.51 ha)
- Odelia V. Robinson Park- Eliot Av. & E. 105th 0.50 acres (0.20 ha)
- Oman Park- E.81st & Mansfield, S.of Union Av. 0.39 acres (0.16 ha)
- Orr Park- Ansel & Lamont Aves. 3.10 acres (1.25 ha)
- Otter Playground -Gill Av. & E. 82nd 4.23 acres (1.71 ha)
- Outlook Playground- E. 59th & Woodland Av. 0.81 acres (0.33 ha)
- Pennsylvania Playground- Pennsylvania Av., E. of E. 65th 2.23 acres (0.90 ha)
- Port Park- E. 73rd, S. of Kinsman Av. 5.05 acres (2.04 ha)
- Public Square -Superior & Ontario Aves. 4.00 acres (1.62 ha)
- R.J. Taylor Park -Melville Rd., off Nottingham Rd. 7.60 acres (3.08 ha)
- Rainbow Park -Rainbow Av., off W. 140th 1.15 acres (0.47 ha)
- Ralph J. Perk Plaza - E. 12th & Chester Av. 1.10 acres (0.45 ha)
- Ralph Schumitsh Park -McGowan Av. & W. 124th 3.66 acres (1.48 ha)
- Rathbun Playground- E. 71st & Rathbun Av.0.41 acres (0.17 ha)
- Raus Playfield- E. 52nd, S. of Fleet Av. 6.54 acres (2.65 ha)
- Regent Park- E. 70th & Regent Rd. 4.66 acres (1.89 ha)
- Roberto Clemente Field -W. 38th & Seymour Av. 4.20 acres (1.70 ha)
- Rotary Plaza -E. 9th & Erieside Av. 0.83 acres (0.34 ha)
- Sam Miller Park- E. 88th, N. of St. Clair Av. 5.72 acres (2.31 ha)
- Saranac Playground -E. 162nd, N. of St. Clair Av. 1.5 acres (0.61 ha)0
- Seneca Golf Course- Valley Pkwy. & Broadview Rd. 350.00 acres (141.64 ha)
- Settlers Landing Park- Old River Road at St. Clair Av. 1.50 acres (0.61 ha)
- Spear Play Lot- E. 145th, N. of Kinsman Av. 0.14 acres (0.057 ha)
- Spencer & E. 53rd Mini Park -Spencer Av. & E. 53rd 0.39 acres (0.16 ha)
- Storer Playground -W. 62 1.18 acres (0.48 ha)
- Terminal Park -W. 145th, N. of I-71 5.13 acres (2.08 ha)
- Thames Park -Thames Av., W. of East 152nd 0.92 acres (0.37 ha)
- Thrush Park- W. 105th & Bellaire Rd. 7.67 acres (3.10 ha)
- Tony Brush Park -Mayfield & Random Rds. 1.82 acres (0.74 ha)
- Topeka Park- E. 137th & Aspinwall Av. 0.72 acres (0.29 ha)
- Train Park -W. 48th & Train Av. 1.20 acres (0.49 ha)
- Tremont Valley Playfield- West 11 and Clark 50.00 acres (20.23 ha)
- Trent Park- Trent Av.& W.40th, S. of Clark Av. 1.21 acres (0.49 ha)
- TulaRd Park- W. 144th, N. of Triskett Rd. 6.56 acres (2.65 ha)
- Turney & E. 93rd Playground- Turney Rd. & E. 93rd 1.20 acres (0.49 ha)
- W.C. Reed Playfield- W. 15th & Denison Av. 14.92|acres|ha}
- Walter A. Burks Playground -Grantwood Av. & E. 111th 2.53 acres (1.02 ha)
- Warsaw Park -E. 64th, N. of Harvard Av.3.52 acres (1.42 ha)
- Washington Park - Washington Pk Blvd, N. of Harvard Leased to Cleveland Metroparks
- Willard Park - E. 9th & Lakeside Av. 1.78 acres (0.72 ha) location of Free Stamp Sculpture
- Worthington Park - Worthington Av. @ W. 128th 8.14 acres (3.29 ha)
