= Webber Pond =

Reservoir in Kennebec County, Maine, United States

- Location within Maine Location within the United States
- Coordinates: 44°24′37″N 69°39′20″W
- Basin countries: United States
- Surface area: 1,233 acres (499 ha)
- Water volume: 18,715 acre⋅ft (23.085 hm^{3})
- Surface elevation: 118 ft (36 m)

Webber Pond is a man-made lake located in Vassalboro, Maine, United States. The water is lowered every October for weed control by the use of a dam; attached to the dam is a fish ladder. The town of Vassalboro maintains a boat launch for public access. The lake also has two islands; the smaller of the two is owned by the town and is open for camping, while the larger is owned privately.

The lake is shallow and weedy, which makes it well suited for warm-water game fish. Fishing tournaments are held every year on the lake. Fish found in the lake are mostly smallmouth bass, largemouth bass, yellow perch, white perch, redbreast sunfish, pumpkinseed sunfish, crappie, and brown trout; later in the season the lake is also home to pickerel.

Webber Pond has been known as an inferior lake because of algae blooms during hot summer months. This problem has been greatly diminished by the Lakes Association's letting thousands of alewives come in through the fish ladder to spawn. The alewives stay less than a week, and the young fish develop in the lake, eating much surplus algae.
