= Susanna Louise Patteson =

American stenographer and author (1853–1922)

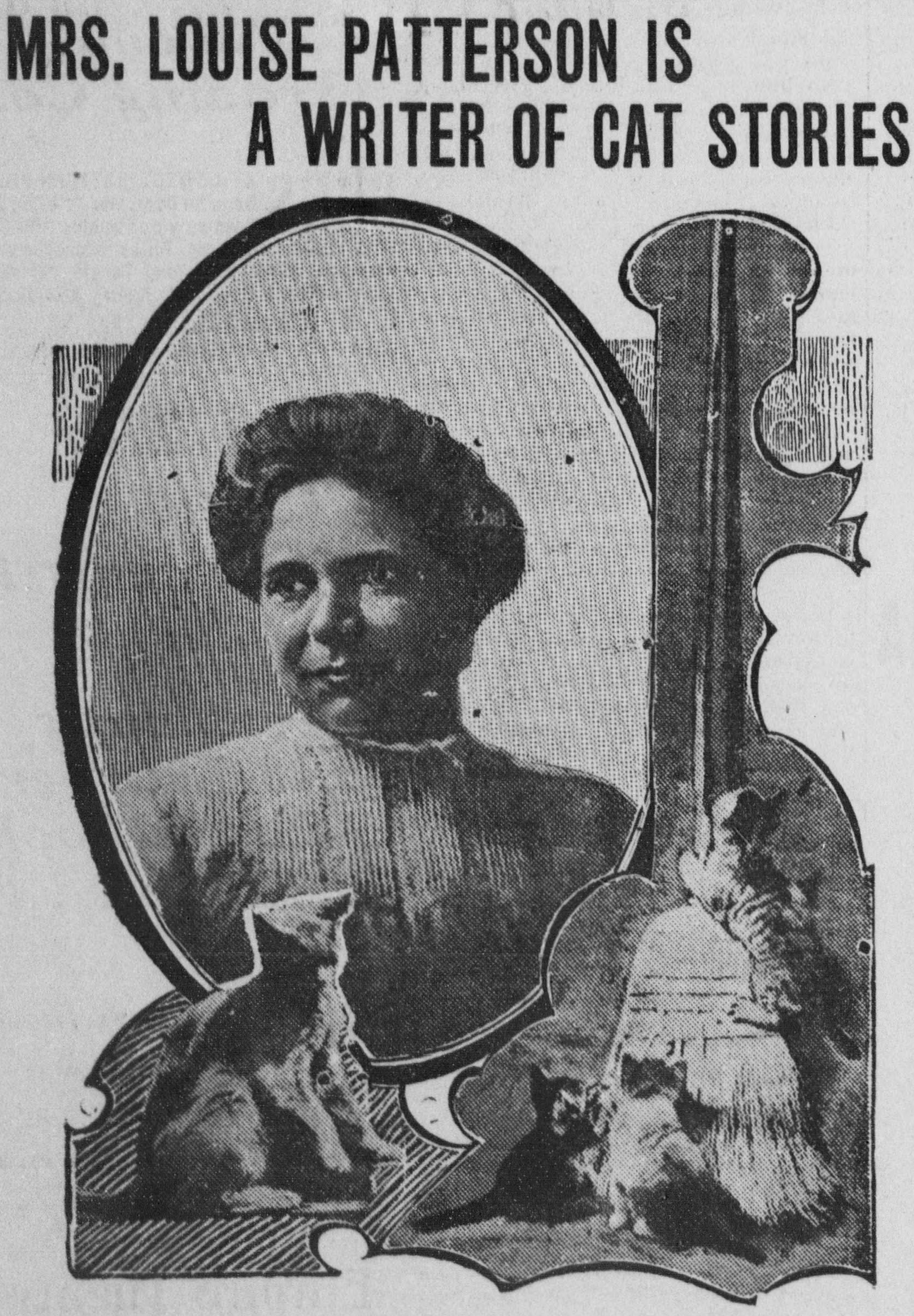
Susanna Louise Patteson (not "Patterson") was an author and cat lover. (1904)

Susanna Louise Patteson (1853–1922) was born as Luisa Griesser in Weiach, Switzerland. She emigrated in 1867 and later became an American stenographer, educator, and author who wrote Pussy Meow: the autobiography of a cat. She also wrote the children's book Letters from Pussycatville, How to Have Bird Neighbors and When I was a Girl in Switzerland. Her photographs were used to illustrate her books on cats and birds. She helped organize a group to aid vagrant cats.

== Career ==
Susanna Louise Patteson worked as a stenographer in Cleveland, Ohio. She wrote a book on stenography, Patteson's Pitmanic Phonography, and advocated for higher status and educational opportunities for women's professions of the time such as nursemaids. She was a local council candidate for the prohibition ticket. She was Swiss. The Cleveland Plain Dealer profiled her and included a sketch of her on January 19, 1896.

In the 1870s, she became a seasonal secretary for John D. Rockefeller when he resided at his summer estate in Forest Hill, Ohio.

In 1909, Louise lived in a house on land owned by Ambrose M. McGregor, the president of Standard Oil, which was founded by Rockefeller. She spent at least ten summers at what she called Waldheim.

== Impact ==
After her death in 1922, her friends and acquaintances established the Patteson Bird Sanctuary in the Shaker Wild Flower garden.

They commissioned a bronze sculpture by noted Cleveland artist Frank Jirouch, and installed it in the Bird Sanctuary in 1929.

== Books ==
- Letters from Pussycatville (1903)
- Patteson's Pitmanic Phonography (1895)
- How to Have Bird Neighbors George W. Jacobs & Co. Philadelphia (1918)
- Pussy Meow; The autobiography of a cat (1901)
- Kitty Kat Kimmie, A cat's tale (1909)
- When I Was a Girl in Switzerland (1921)

=== Articles ===
- "Bird Architecture"
