= 200 Public Square =

Skyscraper in Cleveland, Ohio

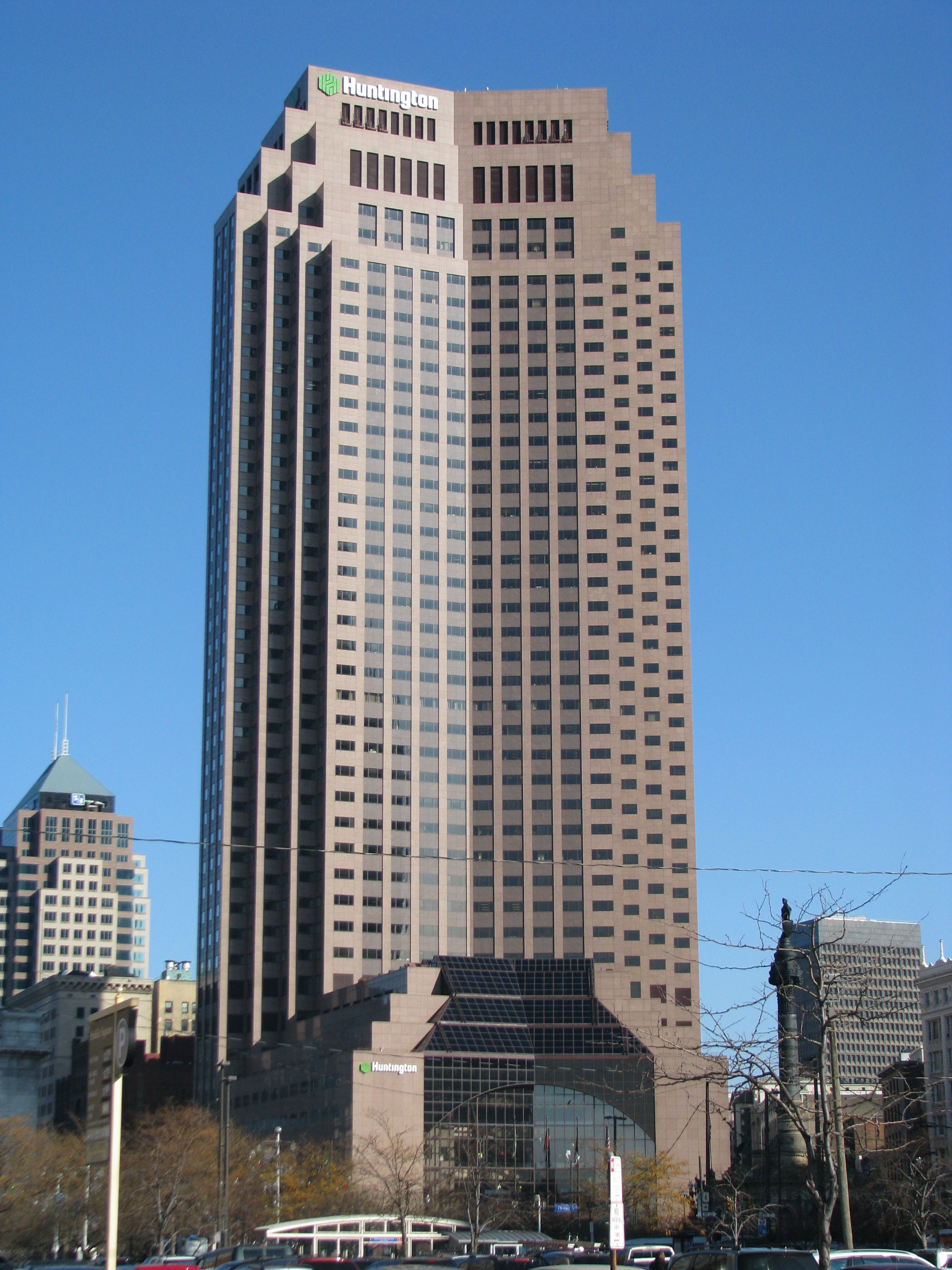
- Interactive map of the 200 Public Square area
- Former names: Sohio Building, BP Building

General information
- Type: Office
- Location: 200 Public Square; Cleveland, Ohio 44114; United States
- Coordinates: 41°30′0.5″N 81°41′29.5″W
- Construction started: 1982
- Completed: 1985

Height
- Roof: 201 m (659 ft)

Technical details
- Floor count: 45
- Floor area: 1.2 million sq ft (110 thousand m^{2}) (office space)

Design and construction
- Architect: Hellmuth, Obata and Kassabaum

Website
- www.200psq.com

200 Public Square is a skyscraper in Cleveland, Ohio. The building, located on Public Square in Downtown Cleveland, reaches 45 stories and 658 feet (201 m) with 1.2 million square feet (110,000 m^{2}) of office space. It is the third-tallest building in Cleveland and fourth-tallest in the state of Ohio. The building opened in 1985 as the headquarters for Standard Oil of Ohio or Sohio, and was known as the Sohio Building or Standard Oil building. After British Petroleum (BP) rebranded Sohio as BP in the early 1990s, the building was often called the BP America Building, BP America Tower, BP Tower, or BP Building, and those earlier names are still regularly used even after BP moved its North American headquarters to Chicago in 1998. It was officially renamed 200 Public Square in 2005 and since 2010, has been Cleveland's regional headquarters for Huntington Bancshares.

== Sohio ==
In November 1981, Standard Oil of Ohio (Sohio) announced plans to build a skyscraper on Public Square. Initially, it was supposed to surpass the Terminal Tower in height, but city officials insisted that the Tower remain the city's tallest building. The BP Building was designed by Hellmuth, Obata and Kassabaum in the postmodern style and angled to be parallel to both Euclid and Superior avenues.

Construction began in 1982 with the demolition of two Cleveland landmarks, the Burnham and Root Cuyahoga Building (1892) and the 16-story George B. Post Williamson Building (1900). The new structure was completed in 1985 and was officially opened in 1987 as the BP America Tower, when British Petroleum purchased the remaining 45% of Sohio and merged its North American holdings to form BP America, Inc., headquartered in the new building.

== BP America, Inc. ==
Claes Oldenburg's Free Stamp sculpture was commissioned by Alton Whitehouse and other Sohio executives to stand in front of the tower, but BP officials did not appreciate it, and donated the sculpture to the City of Cleveland. After some modifications, the city installed it in Willard Park, next to Cleveland City Hall.

Before the Key Tower was built, the BP Building was the second-most prominent skyscraper in the city, often photographed with the adjacent Terminal Tower as a twin emblem of Cleveland. It contains 36 elevators, 10 escalators, 3 fountains, 1 waterfall, 1,500 plants, and several works of art.

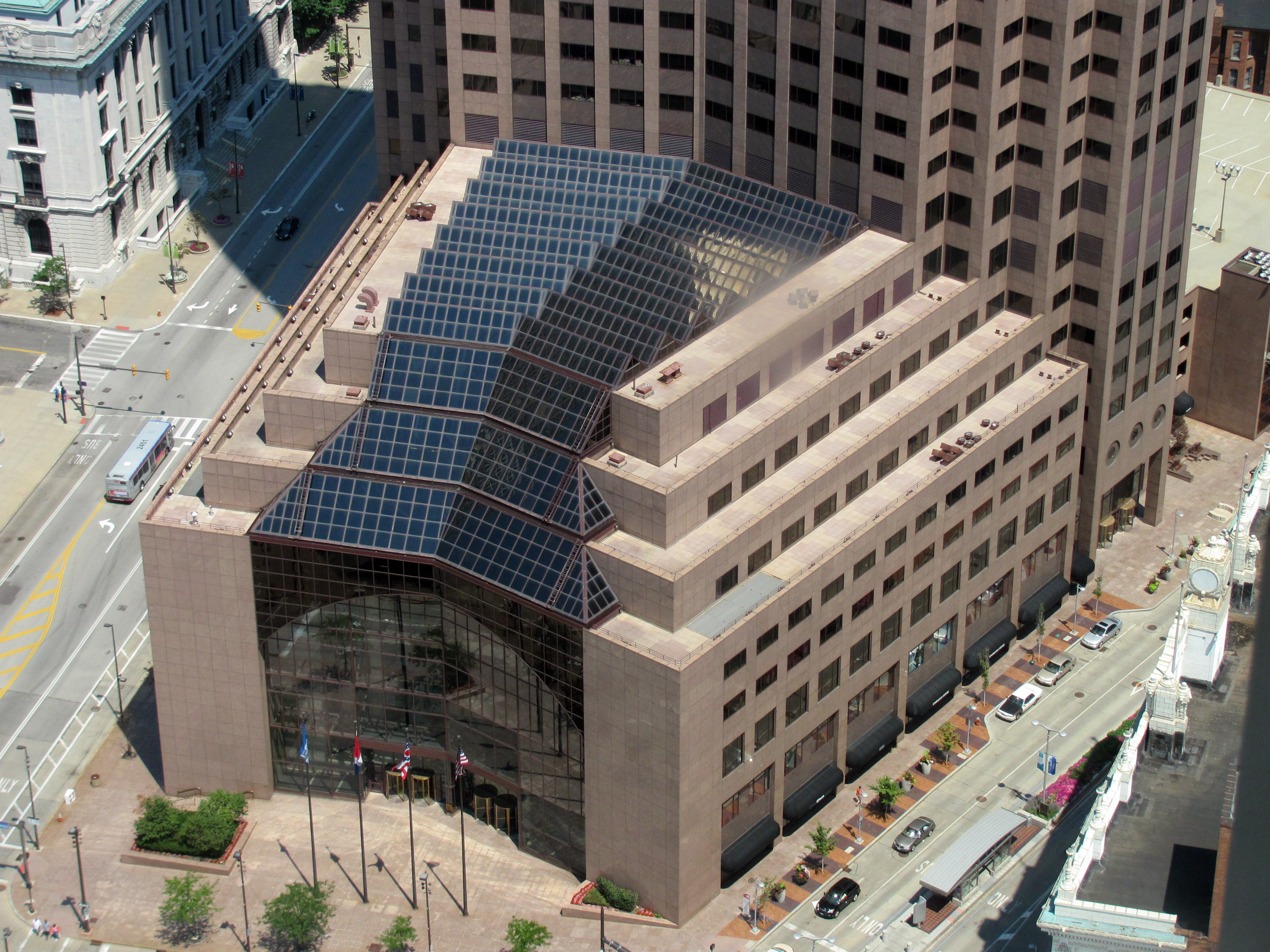
A view of the building's atrium from the observation deck of the Terminal Tower

When BP purchased Chicago-based Amoco in 1998, the company said it would move its headquarters from Cleveland to Chicago. The building was purchased by the Chicago-based EQ Office in 1996 for $144 million, which in turn sold it to Harbor Group International in June 2005 for $141.25 million. Harbor Group worked with Electra Real Estate (TASE: ELTR) to purchase the building. The building was subsequently renamed 200 Public Square. Most Clevelanders and the Harbor Group still recognize it as the BP Tower, although many still refer to it as the Sohio Building.

== Huntington Bank ==
In June 2011, Huntington Bank placed its corporate logo at the top of the building. The bank moved its regional headquarters to the tower from the Huntington Bank Building that September.

Harbor Group International put the building up for sale in June 2011. DRA Advisors bought the building in 2018 and put it up for sale in 2023.

== Atrium gallery ==
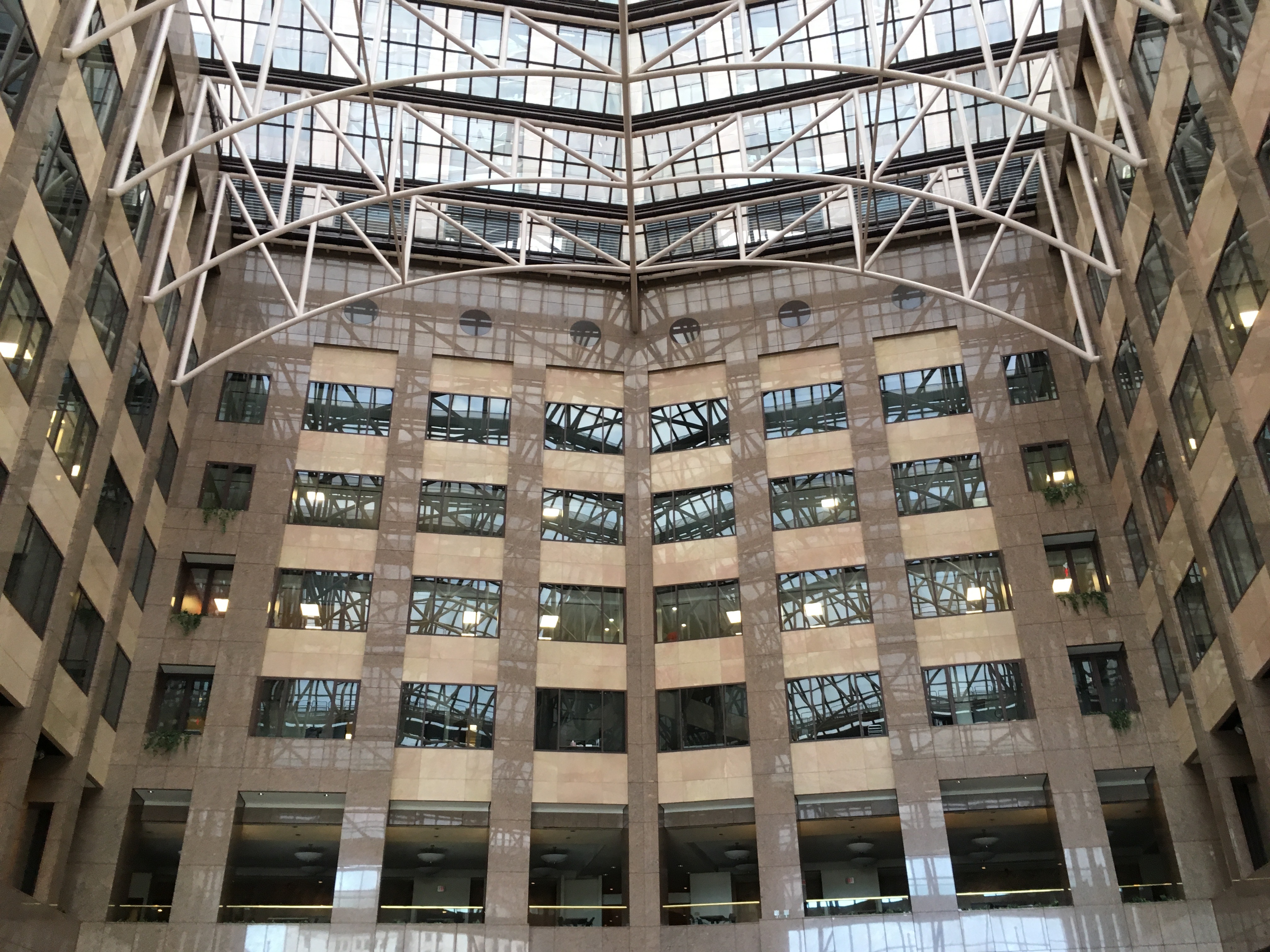

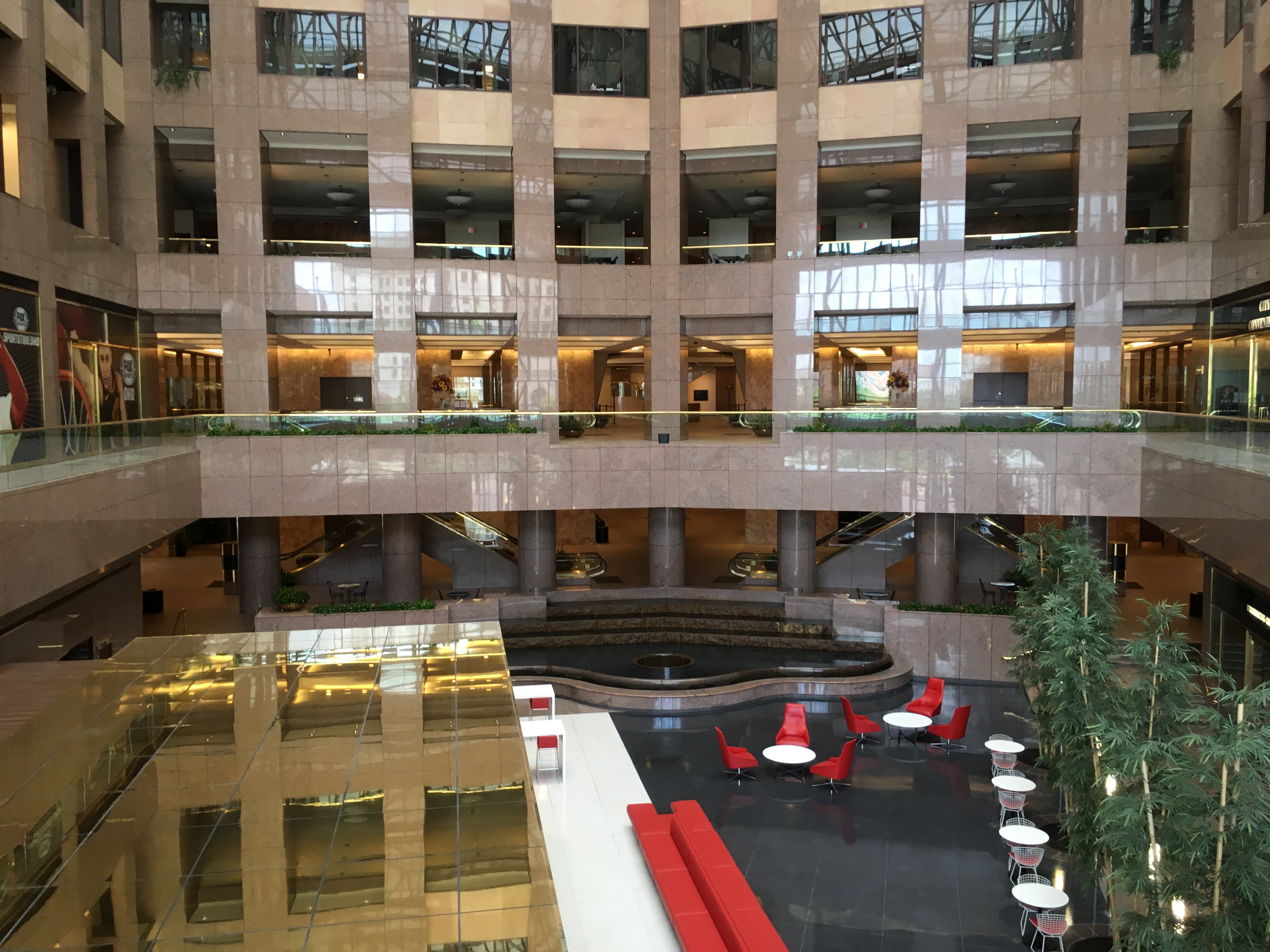

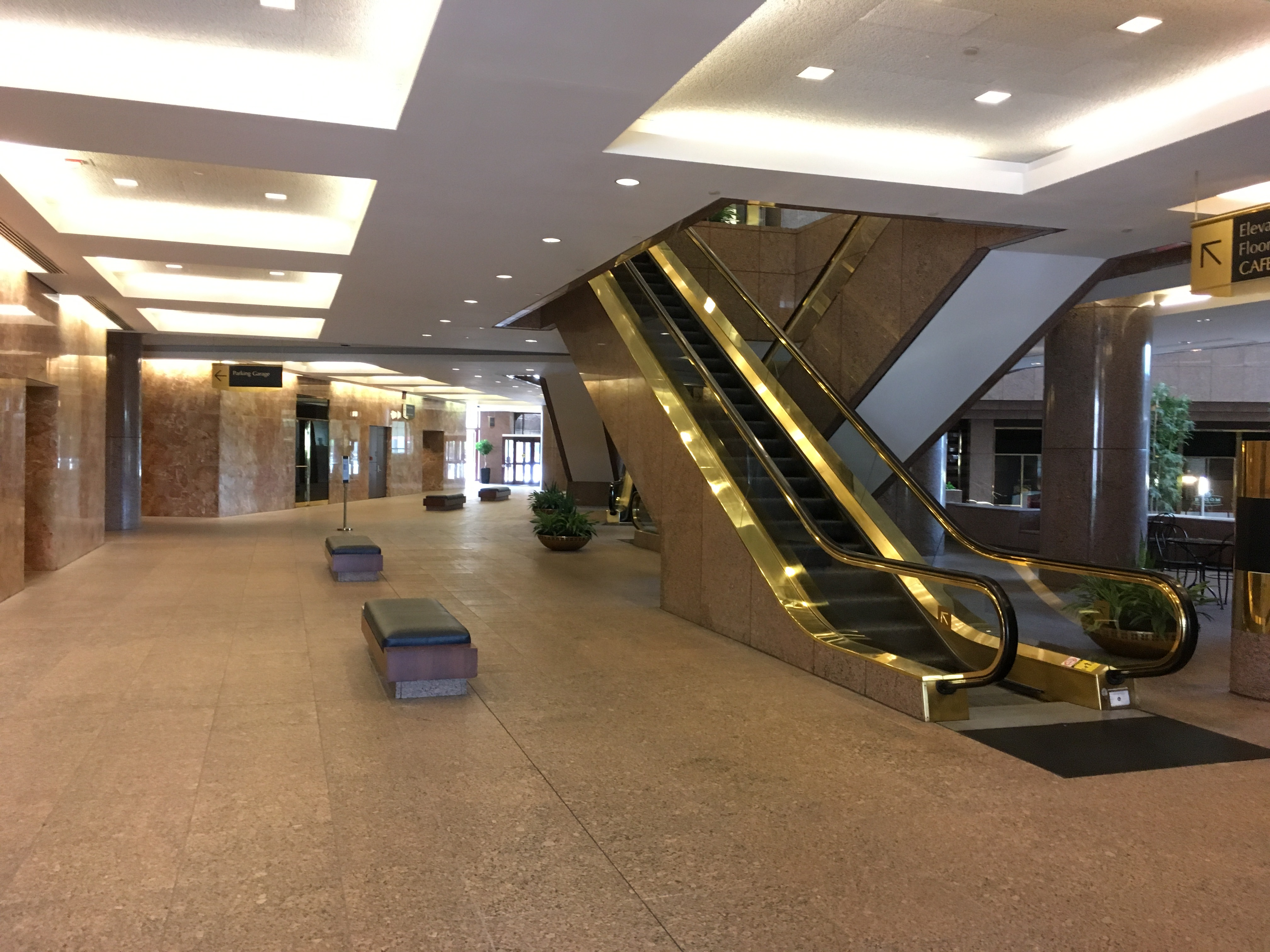

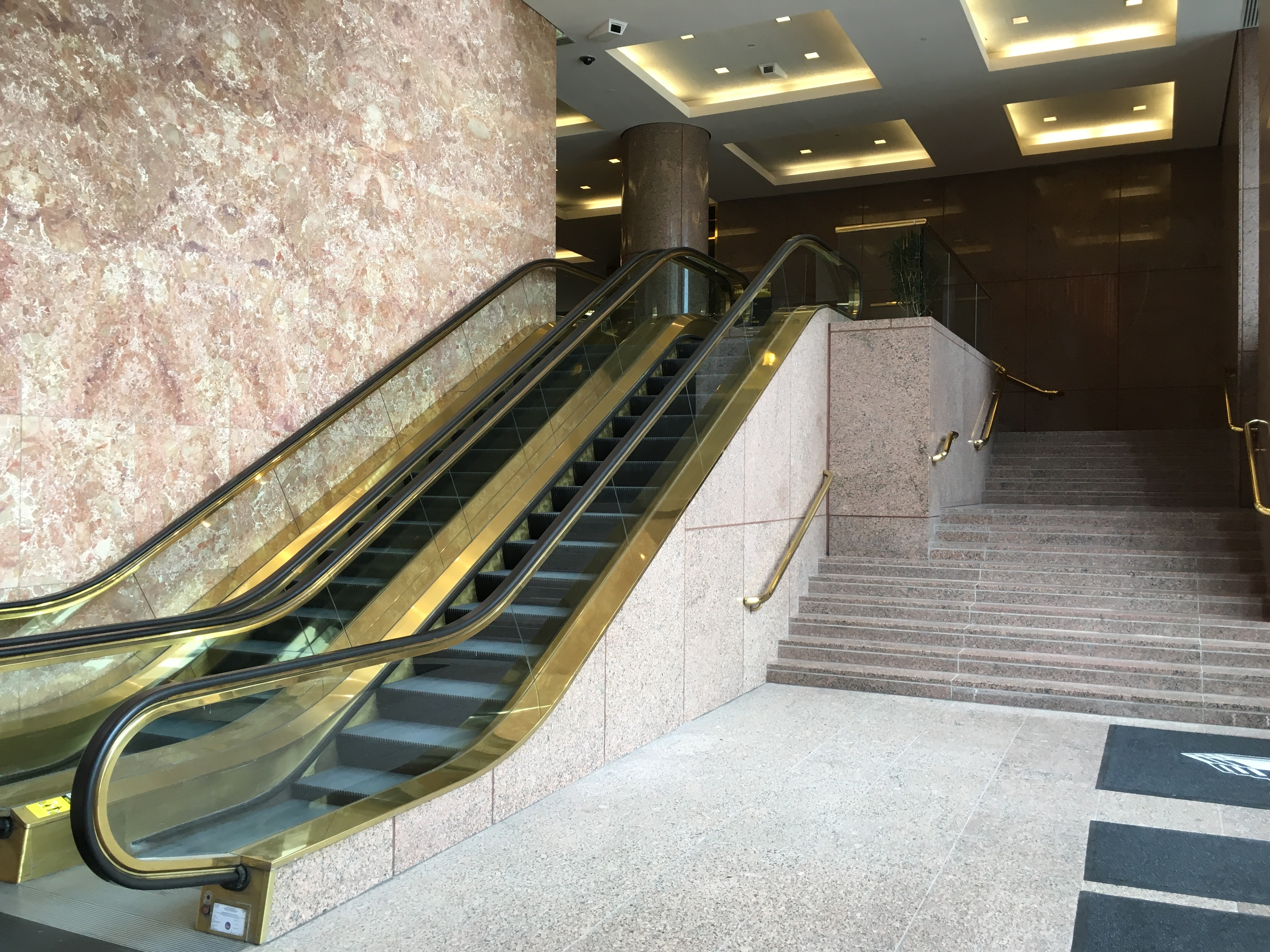

== See also ==
- List of tallest buildings in Cleveland
