= Lake Erie Walleye Trail cheating scandal =

2022 event

- Date: September 30, 2022
- Location: Cleveland, Ohio, United States; 41.5407°N 81.6341°W
- Accused: Chase Cominsky, Jacob Runyan
- Convicted: Both
- Charges: Cheating, possessing criminal tools, attempted grand theft (felonies), and unlawful possession of wild animals (misdemeanor)
- Trial: May 2023
- Verdict: Guilty plea
- Convictions: Cheating and unlawful possession of wild animals
- Sentence: Ten days in jail, $2,500 fine, three year fishing license suspension, and forfeiture of boat

On September 30, 2022, at Gordon Park in Cleveland, Ohio, United States, Chase Cominsky and Jake Runyan, the two winning anglers in the final event of that season's Lake Erie Walleye Trail series of fishing tournaments, were found to have hidden weights in some of the fish they caught and were immediately disqualified. Video of the revelation, showing the pair being confronted by angry fellow anglers, went viral online. The two were charged with several felonies. They later pleaded guilty and received short jail sentences, a fine, a three-year ban from receiving another fishing license, and had to forfeit their boat to the state for later auction. Both men have also faced other criminal charges in their communities.

Other fishermen involved in the tournament had suspected Cominsky and Runyan of cheating since they had won the previous year, even though a failed polygraph test cost them some of their winnings. Before teaming up, neither had finished in the top ten. During the 2022 season, suspicion deepened as they won every tournament they entered with unusually high weights of caught fish. The tournament director, who had initially defended them as particularly skilled anglers, eventually decided to check the fish and put the assertions to rest.

== Background ==
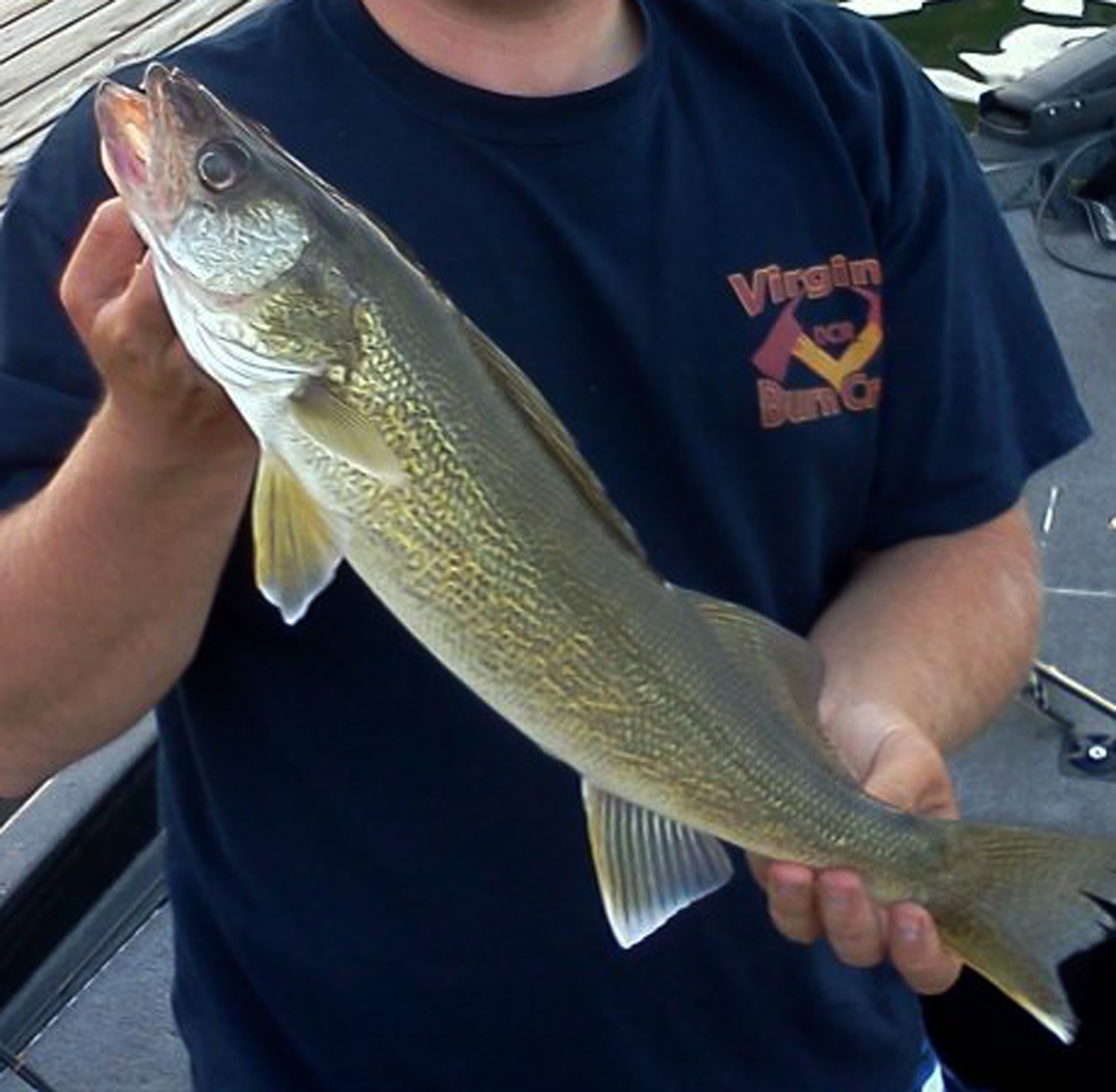
A freshly caught walleye (Sander vitreus)

The Lake Erie Walleye Trail (LEWT) is a series of fishing tournaments over the summer and autumn months run out of different cities on Ohio's Lake Erie shoreline since 2004. Since 2015 it has been open to 60 teams of two anglers each, fishing for walleye on the lake and in the rivers that feed it; winners are judged by the total weight of their catch of five walleyes. Competitors can win either cash or goods donated by sponsors; both at the individual tournament level and the series. Entry fees are $300 per single event and $400 for the championship tournament at the end of the season. Prizes are often well above $10,000 and can sometimes exceed $100,000.

With improvements in technology, and an increase in money from both participants and sponsors in the early 21st century, the stakes in competitive fishing have increased. Those who succeed in the sport can eventually reach a level such as Major League Fishing where they can fish tournaments full-time. Sponsors such as Cabela's and Bass Pro Shops often give even lower-level competitors discounts on equipment and a cash stipend. Those who prosper and rise in the sport's ranks can expect salaries and discounts on boats from companies like Ranger.

These benefits have created a strong incentive for some participating anglers to cheat. Methods include having others catch fish on the cheaters' behalf, fishing in areas off-limits to the tournament, and sometimes stuffing fish with ice, which increases their weight before it melts, leaving no evidence. In 2012 a British angler stole a bass from an aquarium where he had previously worked; that same year several national teams were accused of using a secret bait supplied by the host Romanians to win an international carp fishing tournament. A Texas man attempted to win a 2020 tournament where the prize was awarded for the longest fish by attaching another fish's tail to a bass in his photograph of the fish. "You have to consider that in some of these tournaments, ounces can mean tens, or hundreds, of thousands of dollars," Ross Robertson, a professional angler, told The New York Times. He said cheating is more common than most people realize.

== 2021 series ==
In 2021, one new team, consisting of Cleveland resident Jake Runyan, relatively new to competitive fishing, and Chase Cominsky of Hermitage, Pennsylvania, who had prior experience fishing in tournaments on the lake, vaulted from finishing no higher than 13th to winning the season's last three tournaments and with it, that year's LEWT. They called themselves "the people's champs", angering some anglers who found the pair's sudden improvement dubious and believed Cominsky and Runyan were cheating.

In the season's final tournament, their five largest fish weighed in at 42.69 lb (19.36 kg), eight pounds more than the second-place team and averaging 8.5 lb (3.9 kg) per fish, a figure The Plain Dealer called "impressive". They attributed their victory to fishing closer to the shore than other contestants. The $306,000 in prize money they stood to win was, however, reduced by $120,000 after one of them failed a polygraph related to the Toledo-based Fall Brawl, one of the final tournaments. A Ranger boat went instead to the second-prize winner.

At the time, the duo announced they would take legal action. "Our reputation means the world to us and we would never cheat", Runyan said, calling that injury worse than losing the boat they asserted they had fairly won. In a February 2022 interview with Cleveland Scene, he indicated they were still planning to sue, although he and Cominsky appear never to have done so. In that interview, unpublished at that time, he explained that he was studying for a license to captain ore and tugboats. The cheating allegations and fallout from the failed polygraph test hurt their relationships with sponsors.

=== Runyan's response to cheating allegations ===
Established competitors in the LEWT circuit, Runyan alleged, resented the newcomers' success. The cheating allegations were "political", intended to discredit them. After their first win, in spring 2022, Runyan recalled the lie-detector test lasting three hours. The one following the Fall Brawl was even more unusual to him, in that Cominsky was questioned even though he had not been the one to catch the fish. Both times, he said, the questions had gone beyond the tournament to include queries about zoophilia and adultery. "I had nothing to hide", Runyan maintained. "In the Fall Brawl, I had awoken to how much bullshit was going on. We knew we were screwed."

Runyan criticized many aspects of LEWT's enforcement system. Procedural changes implemented by tournament director Jason Fischer for the upcoming season made him "judge, jury and executioner" in cases of alleged cheating. Runyan also called for an end to the use of lie detectors and voice stress analysis (VSA) to catch suspected cheaters, since those results are inadmissible as evidence in court. Post-tournament inspections of the fish caught, he argued, were more reliable. "If you cut a fish open and there's lead weights in the stomach, well, there you go."

== 2022 series ==
Cominsky and Runyan continued their success in the 2022 LEWT, at one point winning three straight tournaments of the seven in that year's series. That heightened suspicion from other anglers. "I've fished tournaments my whole life", said one later. "No matter how good you are or what you know, nobody wins 'em all." Nicholas Zart, who captains charter boats on the lake and knows it well, recalled that "[i]t didn't matter if you fished for a week and knew every single school of fish out there, they would always beat you by five to eight pounds. And you'd just question it like, 'What the hell is going on?'" He decided not to participate in further tournaments as long as Cominsky and Runyan were allowed to.

Other anglers noted that they never saw the two out on the lake, either during tournaments or at other times, and heard that they never donated their catch to food banks as most other competitors did. When this was reported to have happened after the Rossford Walleye Roundup, it strengthened the belief that Cominsky and Runyan had something to hide. Some of the anglers who saw the pair's winning fish said they "looked old", speculating they had been caught previously and stored in a well.

Complaints and concerns about Cominsky and Runyan eventually reached Fischer. He defended them even when challenged by close friends, reminding them that the two had, that season, regularly passed polygraph and VSA tests and no one had found any other evidence of rule violations, even when at one point an observer had ridden their boat. "They're doing what we ask of them as a tournament series. And they're doing it all. So I can't say they're doing anything wrong", he told them. "I don't want to sound arrogant or cocky", Runyan said on an online fishing show as the end of the season neared. "[B]ut I am confident that we should do well in this championship also because that's just what we do. Winners win."

On September 30, at the LEWT championship and final event of the year, as anglers brought their fish back to the East 72nd Street boat ramps in Cleveland's Gordon Park, Cominsky and Runyan again appeared to have won handily. Their heaviest fish weighed in at 7.9 lb (3.6 kg), well above the three-pound average and the heaviest fish caught by any competing team. Their 33.91-pound (15.38 kg) total catch also easily clinched them their fourth straight tournament, a second straight LEWT championship and another $30,000.

=== Exposure of cheating ===
Onlookers noted that the pair did not seem terribly excited about the wins, posing for a few pictures with the fish, then bagging them and preparing to leave. At that point other anglers, many of whom suspected Cominsky and Runyan, started talking, and asked Fischer to inspect their fish more closely. He was immediately struck by the walleyes looking like average Lake Erie specimens, which weigh around 4–5 pounds, rather than the size their weight would have suggested. Fischer told Runyan that he wanted to take another look.

"[H]e's like, you know what, this has got to stop. You know, I'm, I'm tired of this. And I said, me too, which is why I'm checking the fish", Fischer recalled, as Cominsky continued leaving. With Runyan stepping back to the weigh station, Fischer put the fish on the ground, looked at them and then touched them. He felt an unusually hard bulge in one and asked his weighman for a knife. "I knew that there was something in there", said Fischer. "And I mean, it's just like I cut the fish and the weight immediately falls into my hand."

External videos
- Video from livestream of the weights being discovered, starting at 14:39

"We got weights in fish!" he yelled, attracting the attention of the other anglers. Fischer angrily told Runyan to leave and gestured for him to do so, in a manner media reports likened to a baseball umpire ejecting a player or manager from a game. He cut open other fish and found both more weights (10 lead sinkers in all) and sections of other fish, perhaps added to pad the weights and prevent their discovery. Ultimately they had increased the weight of Cominsky and Runyan's catch by seven pounds. The other anglers gathered around, voicing their anger at Runyan as he looked at his shoes. Fischer, a police sergeant in a suburb of Cleveland, called on the crowd to let Runyan leave and not assault him. (Note: One angler present said the crowd's knowledge that Fischer was a police officer was the only thing that kept violence from breaking out.) He felt personally let down by Runyan after having defended him so much.

Police were called to ensure that Cominsky and Runyan could safely leave the scene. Many of the other anglers called for them to be arrested on the spot; police merely took their names. The two shouted at the angry competitors and gave them the finger as they drove off. Steve Hendricks, one of the team who won the tournament after Cominsky and Runyan were disqualified, said he was more satisfied with that than winning. "It's awesome that we won, but it's better knowing that we don't ever have to deal with that bullshit ever again."

The conclusion of the tournament had been livestreamed on Facebook; video of Fischer's discovery of the weights went viral on YouTube and other social networks and the incident became national news. The Ohio Department of Natural Resources (ODNR) took the fish and weights as evidence, along with Cominsky and Runyan's boat, to investigate and prepare a report to the Cuyahoga County prosecutor's office. On the boat ODNR found a hidden compartment below the steering wheel that smelled like rotten fish, suggesting the possibility the pair may have stashed fish caught previously for the tournaments.

== Criminal cases ==
Within a month of their exposure as cheaters, Cominsky and Runyan had been indicted by a grand jury on fifth-degree felony charges of cheating, attempted grand theft, and possessing criminal tools, along with a fourth-degree misdemeanor charge of unlawful possession of wild animals. All the charges arose from the discoveries of a month before; no evidence was found to support the suspicions of cheating in earlier tournaments. The two pleaded not guilty at their arraignment and were released on $2,500 bond. If convicted on all charges, they faced up to three years in prison.

Trial was scheduled for March 2023; prosecutors had 30 witnesses prepared to testify. Immediately beforehand Cominsky and Runyan reached an agreement with prosecutors to plead guilty to cheating and the misdemeanor charge. In return they agreed to a three-year suspension of their fishing licenses, forfeiture of Cominsky's Ranger boat worth $100,000, and up to a year's probation. At their sentencing in May the two expressed remorse. "It's something I wish I could say didn't happen, but I can't", Cominsky told Court of Common Pleas Judge Steven Gall. He apologized to Fischer, who had stood behind them until he found the weights. Runyan said the cheating was "the most ignorant decision I've ever made in my life."

Fischer testified that Cominsky and Runyan had won nine of the 19 tournaments he had overseen as LEWT director, compared to just two for the next most successful competitors. "There was always some sort of smoke behind these two." County prosecutor Michael O'Malley agreed that despite the charges applying only to the last tournament of 2022, their other victories "were probably fraudulent as well." Their fish were heavy enough that they might have been able to win the tournament without the added weights, although it was unclear whether they had caught those fish that day, prosecutors noted. In addition to the terms they had already agreed to with prosecutors, Gall sentenced Cominsky and Runyan to 10 days in jail with an additional 30 days if they violated probation, and fined them $2,500, an amount that would be halved if they donated the other half to a nonprofit organization that promotes fishing for children. Their lawyers said that no punishment they could receive would be as severe as the lifelong stigma that would attach to them. "When they get Googled, this case is gonna show up forever," said Gregory Gentile.

Some of the LEWT anglers believed Cominsky and Runyan had been punished too lightly. "They stole $300,000 to $400,000 and only served 10 days? Had some pretty good change if you ask me", said one, Joe Whitten. "I did the professional tour for over 15 years, and I never imagined that somebody could or would cheat." Another angler wrote in a later email to a reporter that "Any person who has a vested interest in this saga would tell you that they are likely not happy with the outcome of the legal side of things or the 'slap on the wrist' they received."

=== Other criminal charges and convictions ===
In December 2023, Cominsky also pleaded guilty to another felony charge, conspiracy to commit forgery, in Pennsylvania. He had earlier given his son two $100 bills marked for exclusive use in film production only to spend at a bowling alley. Charges of deer poaching also brought by the state against him were dropped the following month; he and Runyan are also facing charges in incidents unrelated to the cheating scandal.

== Aftermath ==
In August 2024, ODNR announced it had sold the pair's 22-foot (6.7 m) boat, registered to Cominsky, through an online auction. Seized along with its trailer and two outboard motors, it was valued at the time at $100,000. The winning bid was $82,000, after taxes and fees. ODNR's Division of Wildlife said it would use the proceeds to buy another boat to use for fishing enforcement on Lake Erie.

Fischer said at Cominsky and Runyan's sentencing that the negative publicity from the incident had prompted Cleveland Metroparks to revoke the LEWT's permission to host a tournament at its facilities, or at least steeply increase the fee for the permit. A June 2023 event was relocated to Lorain and the season's final event to Fairport Harbor. A spokeswoman for Metroparks denied that any such decision had been made and implied that LEWT would be welcome to hold another tournament in its parks. The Rossport LEWT event, however, was canceled after Bass Pro withdrew its sponsorship and the city withdrew permission.

For the 2023 series, LEWT instituted some measures to prevent further cheating like what Cominsky and Runyan had done. All the top five finishing teams in each tournament will have their fish physically inspected, including possibly being cut open, and a metal detector will be available. Lie detectors will remain in use.

In April 2024, the Sundance TV show True Crime Story: Smugshot devoted an episode, "Fishing for the Truth", to the scandal.

== See also ==
- Crime in Ohio
