= Walleye fishing =

Sport in North America

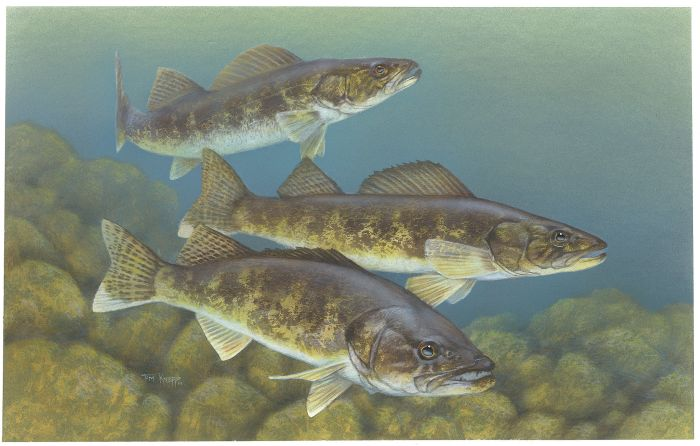
Walleye (painting)

Fishing for walleye is a popular sport with anglers in Canada and the Northern United States, where the fish is native. The current IGFA all tackle record is 11.34 kilograms (25 lb 0 oz), caught on August 2, 1960 in Old Hickory Lake, Tennessee.

The sport is regulated by most natural resource agencies. Management may include the use of quotas and length limits to ensure that populations are not over-exploited. As one example, in the state of Michigan, walleye of under 15" may not be legally kept, except from Lake St. Clair, Saginaw Bay and the St. Clair River, where walleye of 13" are legal to take. Many states also issue slot regulations on walleye. This is where you can keep fish below a certain size and others above. The slot limit protects the medium-sized fish, which can be considered to be at prime sexual maturity.

== Characteristics ==
Since walleyes have excellent visual acuity under low illumination levels, they tend to feed more extensively at dawn and dusk, on cloudy or overcast days and under choppy conditions when light penetration into the water column is disrupted. Even though these are ideal walleye fishing conditions, there can be many great days of walleye fishing on the sunniest days. Although anglers interpret this as light avoidance, it is merely an expression of the walleye's competitive advantage over its prey under those conditions. Similarly, in darkly stained or turbid waters, walleye tend to feed throughout the day.

"Walleye chop" is a term used by walleye anglers for rough water typically with winds of 4 to 15 mph (7 to 24 km/h), and is one of the indicators for good walleye fishing due to the walleye's increased feeding activity during such conditions. In sunny conditions walleye move in schools to deeper shady areas, so when one walleye is caught there are usually other walleye feeding in the same location. These schools usually contain walleye of similar age and size.

== Bait ==
Casting or trolling with spinners or minnow-imitating plugs is a good bet. Special worm harness rigs of spinners and beads are often trolled. Jigs, either traditional bucktails, or tipped with any of the modern plastics, a piece of worm or minnow are walleye angling favorites. Spoons are also good.

Live baits are often still-fished, drifted or trolled on slip-sinker or "bottom-bouncing" rigs. Excellent live bait choices are nightcrawlers, minnows, or leeches, all of which can be used on a jig.

In springtime walleye will take almost any bait or lure, but may be more challenging to catch through the summer months because forage like mayflies or minnows are abundant. Fall often brings another peak of walleye feeding activity.

Walleye are readily caught through the ice in winter, usually on jigs, jigging spoons or minnows. When ice fishing, walleye are caught jigging or on tip-ups. Tip-ups are generally set up with a dacron backing and a clear synthetic leader. For bait, the most common minnows are fatheads and shiners. Size for bait is anywhere from 1 to 7 inches.

Walleye are not known for their fight in fish below about 24" in size. They fight well if over that size, however. Their wide appeal is partially the challenge in catching them, and partially their great popularity as a food fish.

== See also ==
- Lake Erie Walleye Trail fishing tournament cheating scandal

== Notes ==
- Sternberg, Dick (1999) Successful Walleye Fishing Creative Publishing international. ISBN 978-0-86573-095-3
- Walleye: Patterns & Presentations Creative Publishing International (2000). ISBN 978-0-86573-130-1
