= Willard Park, Cleveland =

Public park in Cleveland, Ohio, U.S.

Willard Park
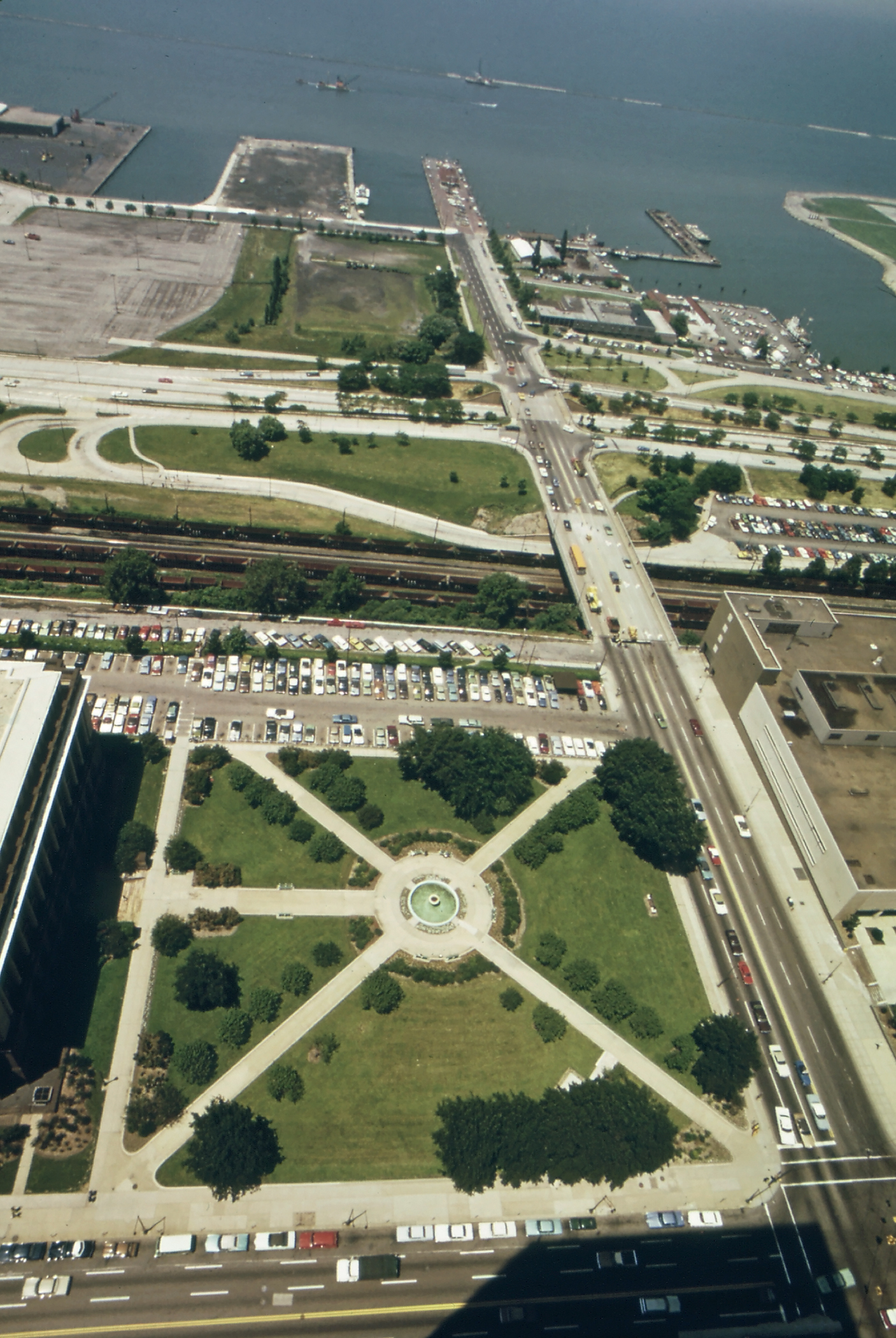
- Aerial view of Willard Park in 1973
- Interactive map of Willard Park
- Type: Urban park
- Location: Cleveland, Ohio, U.S.
- Coordinates: 41.5055°N 81.6925°W
- Area: 0.72 acres (0.29 ha)
- Operator: Cleveland Public Parks District
- Public transit: East 9th–North Coast

Willard Park is a public park in downtown Cleveland, in the U.S. state of Ohio. The park sits at the northwest corner of East 9th Street and Lakeside Avenue, adjacent to Cleveland City Hall, and is within the boundaries of the Cleveland Mall historic district. It is the location of the public sculpture Free Stamp, and is the home of the original Cleveland Fire Fighters Memorial.

Willard Park is named after the artist Archibald Willard. A copy of Archibald's painting The Spirit of '76 hangs in the Rotunda of the neighboring Cleveland City Hall.

== Free Stamp ==
The Free Stamp is an outdoor sculpture located in Willard Park. Created by Claes Oldenburg and his wife Coosje van Bruggen, it has been called the "world's largest rubber stamp". The dimensions of the sculpture are 28 ft 10 in (8.79 m) by 26 ft (7.9 m) by 49 ft (15 m). The sculpture depicts a rubber stamp with the word "FREE" in its stamping area.

The work was commissioned by The Standard Oil Company (Ohio) in 1982 for display at its soon-to-be-constructed headquarters building on Public Square, which became the BP America Tower. The piece was originally designed to stand upright, with the lettering of the stamp hidden from view on its "stamp pad". According to one of the executives working with Oldenburg, the message on the stamp was intended as a reference to the Civil War-era Soldiers' and Sailors' Monument, located across the street. In an interview with WKYC-TV at the sculpture's 1991 dedication, Oldenburg said the stamp's message, "Free," referred to the emancipation of American slaves during and after the Civil War.

Controlling interest in Standard Oil had previously been acquired by BP as part of the financing arrangements for construction of the Trans Alaska pipeline and oil rights to Prudhoe Bay reserves. BP executive Robert Horton took over the management of the retitled company, BP America, before the sculpture was installed. He believed that the stamp was "inappropriate" for the location, and that Oldenburg actually intended to mock BP about Sohio's loss of corporate freedom and the lack of freedom in office work. The company gave the artists permission to move the sculpture to another part of the city, but they refused. As a result, the stamp was placed in storage in a facility in Whiting, Indiana. Over the next several years, BP America, the artists, and the city consulted to find a new site for the sculpture. Several sites were proposed, including the Cleveland Museum of Art. The artists, who wanted the sculpture to remain near Public Square, finally chose Willard Park.

In 1991, BP donated the sculpture to the city of Cleveland. The stamp was modified to sit on its side, and it was dedicated in its new location on November 15, 1991. At the dedication, Oldenburg told a WKYC-TV producer that it looked as if a giant hand had picked up the sculpture from its intended location at the BP Tower and angrily hurled it several blocks, where it ended up on its side.
