= Gordon Park, Cleveland =

Park in Cleveland, Ohio, United States

Coordinates: 41°32′15″N 81°38′09″W

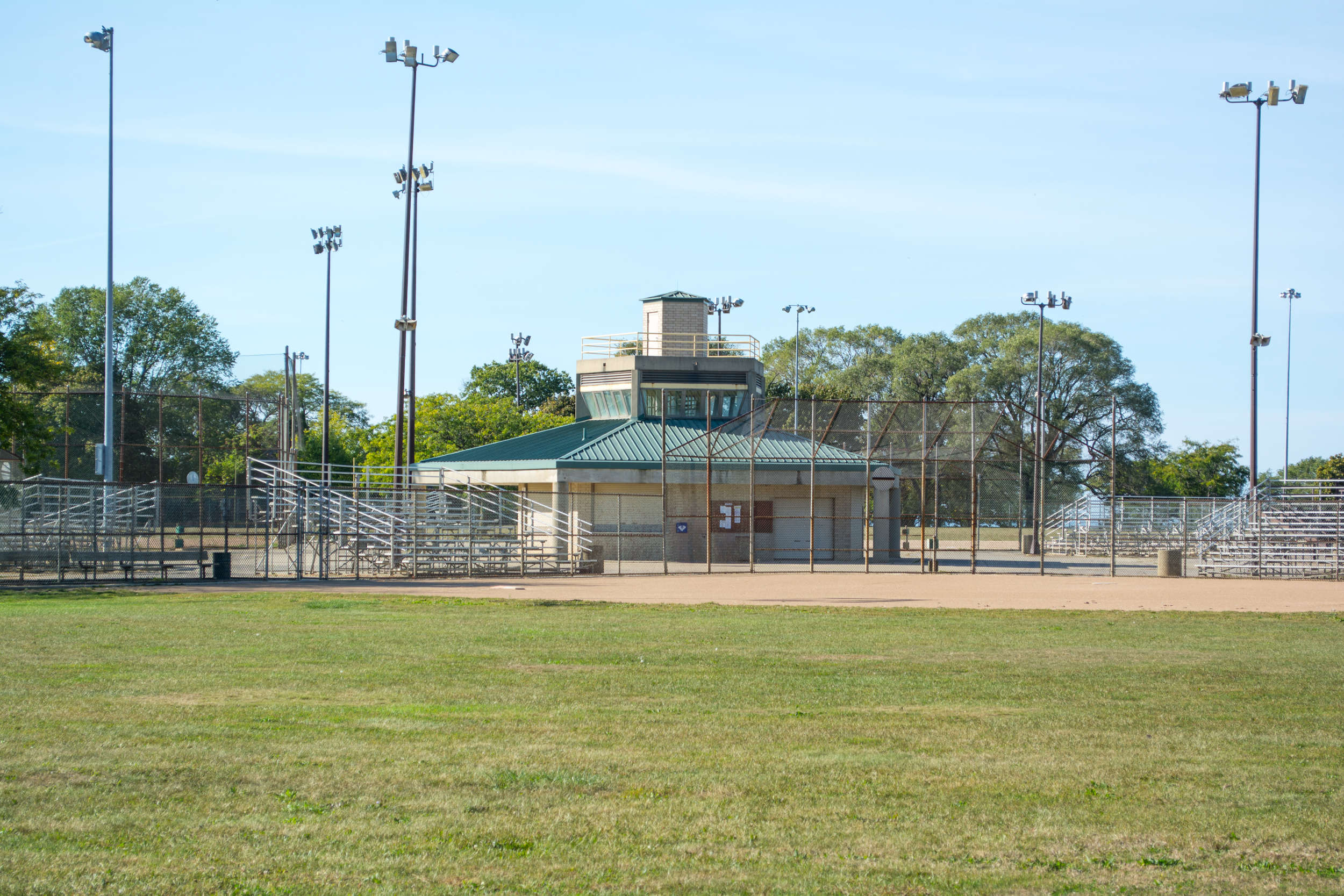
Amenities building and a baseball field at Gordon Park

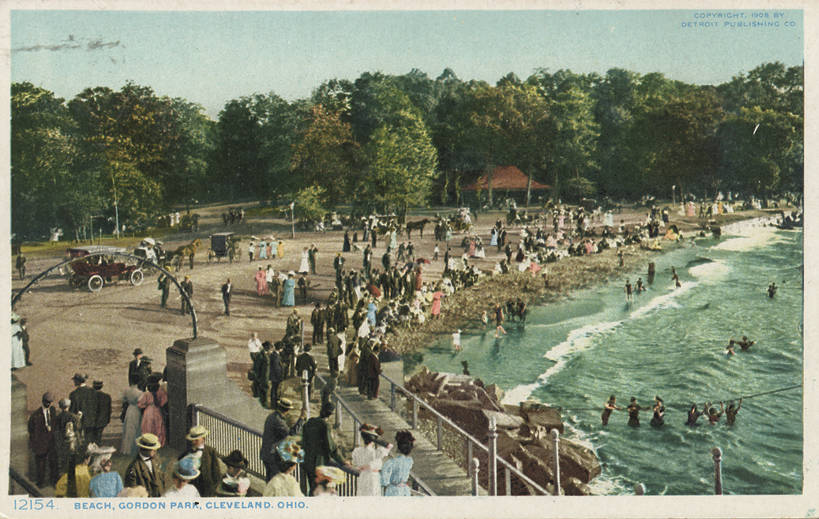
Gordon Park beach, circa 1900s

Gordon Park is a public park located in Cleveland, Ohio, in the United States. A part of the Cleveland Public Parks District, the park opened in 1893 and is situated on 122 acres (49 ha) of land adjacent Lake Erie on the city's East Side. It is named in honor of philanthropist and industrialist William J. Gordon, who originally owned and developed the land as part of his estate. In 1978 the section of the park adjacent to the lakeshore was incorporated, along with five other individual recreational areas along the lake, into the larger state-funded district known as Cleveland Lakefront State Park. The Lakefront State Park headquarters are located in Gordon Park. In April 2013, Cleveland City Council approved a 99-year leasing of Gordon Park to the Cleveland Metroparks system.

== History ==
Gordon, one of the founders of the Cleveland Iron Mining Company, was responsible for initially landscaping the stretch of land, with the specific intention of bequeathing it to the City of Cleveland as a public recreation area.

=== Cleveland Aquarium ===
The Cleveland Aquarium opened on February 6, 1954, in Gordon Park. It was created by the Cleveland Aquarium Society, a group formed in the 1940s, the City of Cleveland and the Cleveland Museum of Natural History, which operated the facility. The aquarium was housed in a building constructed in the 1930s that previously served as bath house. In 1943, the Cleveland Museum of Natural History converted it into a trailside museum, displaying local flora and fauna as well as exhibits of freshwater fish of Lake Erie. That museum closed in 1953 when the Cleveland Memorial Shoreway cut Gordon Park in two.

In the early 1950s, the Cleveland Museum of Natural History, which had previously had aquatic exhibits on its second floor of former home, moved to its own new building and consolidated its aquatic collection into the Cleveland Aquarium. The old Gordon Park trailside museum was renovated by Cleveland Aquarium Society volunteers for about $25,000.

The aquarium had 50 freshwater and marine exhibits including sharks, sawfish, seahorses, eels, squid, octopus, and coral. It acquired a pair of Australian lungfish in 1966 and a school of red-bellied piranhas in 1970. Under the Natural History Museum's direction, the aquarium often drew more visitors than the building could handle. A $300,000 gift from the Leonard C. Hanna Foundation financed the construction of a new octagonal wing in 1967 that tripled the aquarium's size and increased its tank capacity from 8,000 to 82,000 US gallons (30,000–310,000 L).

Despite annual deficits experienced during the decade, a city council override of a mayoral veto to increase the admission charges and keep aquarium operations with the museum was performed in 1979.

Structural problems with the building forced the closing of the aquarium to the public in June 1985. The former aquarium site then became a police dog training facility for the City of Cleveland. On April 1, 1986, fish and exhibits were moved to the Cleveland Metroparks Zoo, where as of 2009 they were in the Primate, Cat & Aquatics Building. The aquarium building was demolished in October 2023.

The unrelated Greater Cleveland Aquarium opened in Cleveland's Flats district in 2012.

== See also ==
- Lake Erie Walleye Trail cheating scandal – occurred at Gordon Park in 2022
