= Wade Park (Cleveland park) =

Park in Cleveland, Ohio

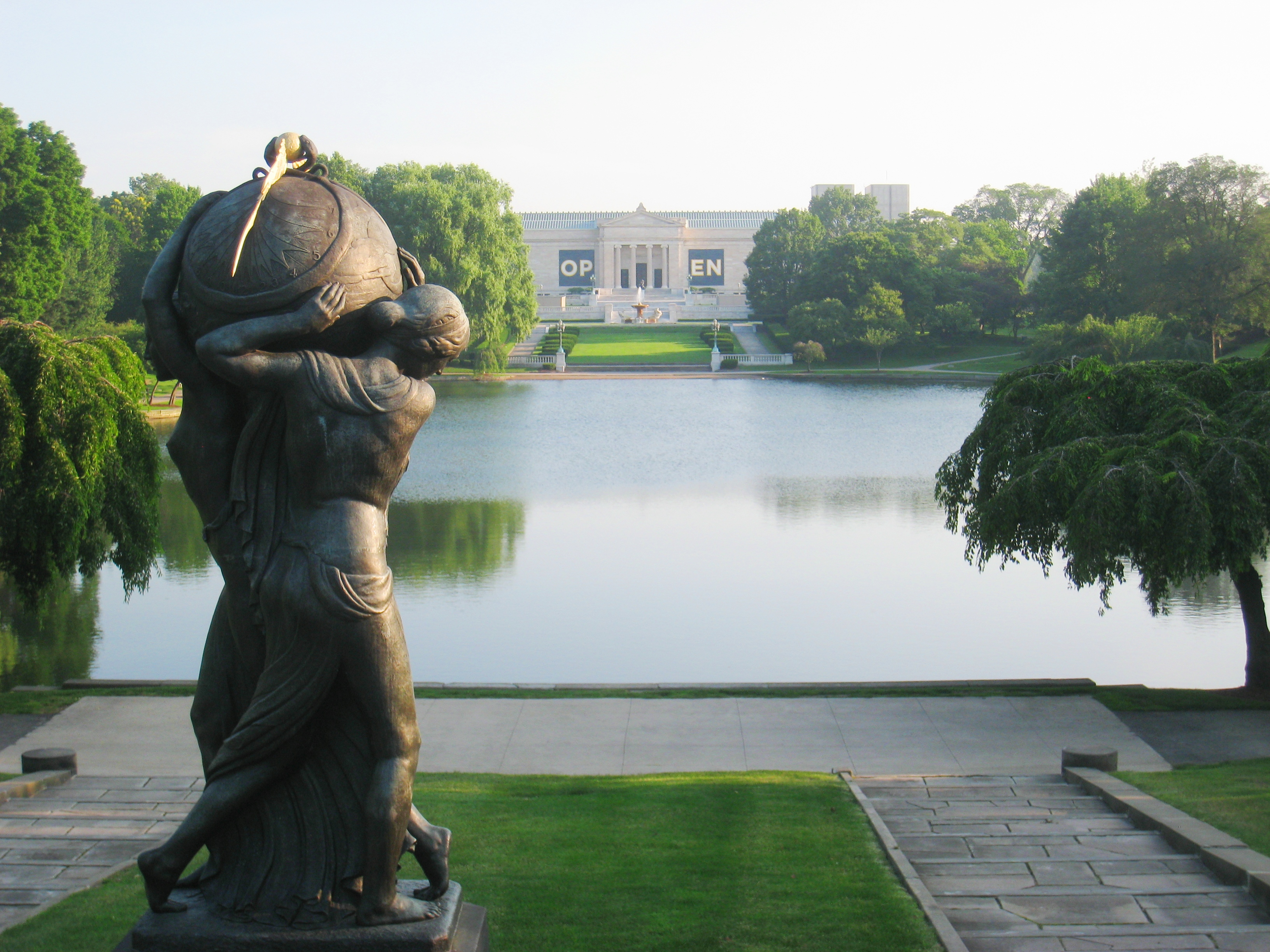
- View of the museum from the steps of the Euclid Avenue entrance to Wade Park, overlooking the Lagoon. Seen in the foreground is Frank Jirouch's 1928 bronze sculpture, Night Passing the Earth to Day.
- Interactive map of Wade Park
- Type: Urban park
- Location: Cleveland
- Coordinates: 41.51°N 81.61°W
- Area: 63 acres (25 ha)
- Created: 1882
- Operator: Private

Wade Park is a park in the University Circle neighborhood of Cleveland, Ohio. Wade Park today largely serves as the campus for the Cleveland Museum of Art, the Cleveland Botanical Garden, and the Cleveland Museum of Natural History, as well as Wade Lagoon, which faces the Museum of Art from the south end of the park. Though not technically a historical landmark itself, the park falls within the eponymous Wade Park historical district and serves as a backdrop for most of its registered buildings.

The site's early owner, Jeptha Wade, began to develop it into a park in 1872; in 1882, he donated the 63-acre plot to the city government, which later purchased additional land to expand it. As Wade had envisioned, the park became the home of an art museum in 1916 with the opening of the Cleveland Museum of Art.

The park also contains the Wade Park Fine Arts Garden, where a number of sculptures from the CMA's holdings are showcased. The bulk of this collection are located between the original 1916 main entrance to the building and the lagoon. The collection includes a large cast of Auguste Rodin's The Thinker, which sits atop the museum's main staircase. Partially destroyed in a 1970 bombing (allegedly by The Weathermen), the statue has been left largely unrestored both because of Rodin's personal involvement in its original casting and his own willingness to exhibit damaged versions of his works during his life. Today, the damage—which is notated on the plaque mounted at the base of the statue's pedestal—has come to define the casting as unique among the more than twenty original large castings.

Other prominent sculptures in the garden include Gaetano Trentanove's 1904 monument to the Polish expatriate and American Revolutionary War-hero Tadeusz Kościuszko; Chester Beach's 1927 Fountain of the Waters, and a 1928 bronze statuary sundial by Frank Jirouch, Night Passing the Earth to Day, which sits across Wade Lagoon from the museum, near the park's entrance on Euclid Avenue.

Wade Park also borders two sections of the city's larger Rockefeller Park. One lies on Wade Park's northwestern border along Martin Luther King Jr. Dr. and the other directly across University Circle to the southeast on Euclid Ave.

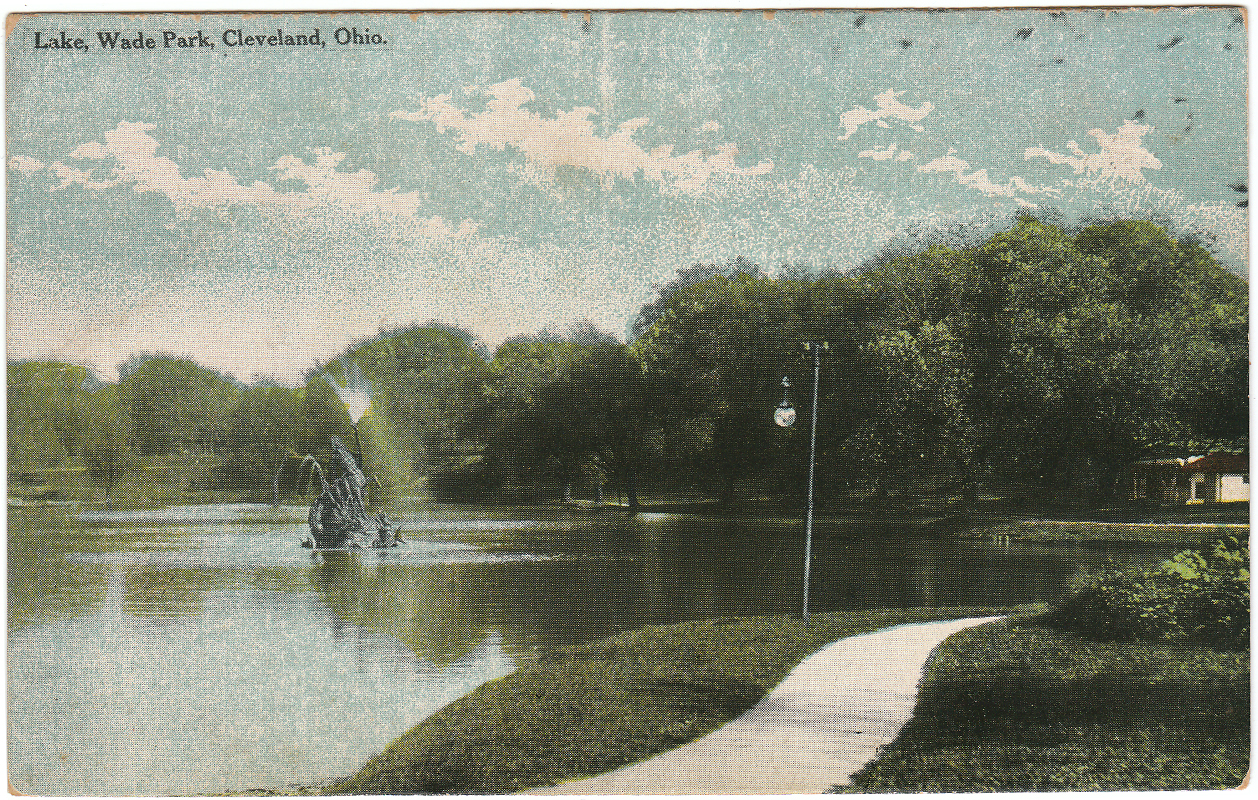
A 1914 postcard image of the lake at Wade Park in Cleveland, Ohio

== Attractions ==
- The Cleveland Museum of Art - Located at the southern entrance of the park along Euclid Avenue, the museum sits behind Wade Lagoon.
- The Cleveland Museum of Natural History - Located in the northwestern corner of the park
- Cleveland Botanical Garden - Founded in 1930 as the Garden Center of Greater Cleveland, the garden, which underwent an extensive makeover in 2003, is situated on East Boulevard in the northeastern portion of the park.
