= Northern Ohio Food Terminal =

Food complex in Cleveland, Ohio

Coordinates: 41°29′21″N 81°39′40″W

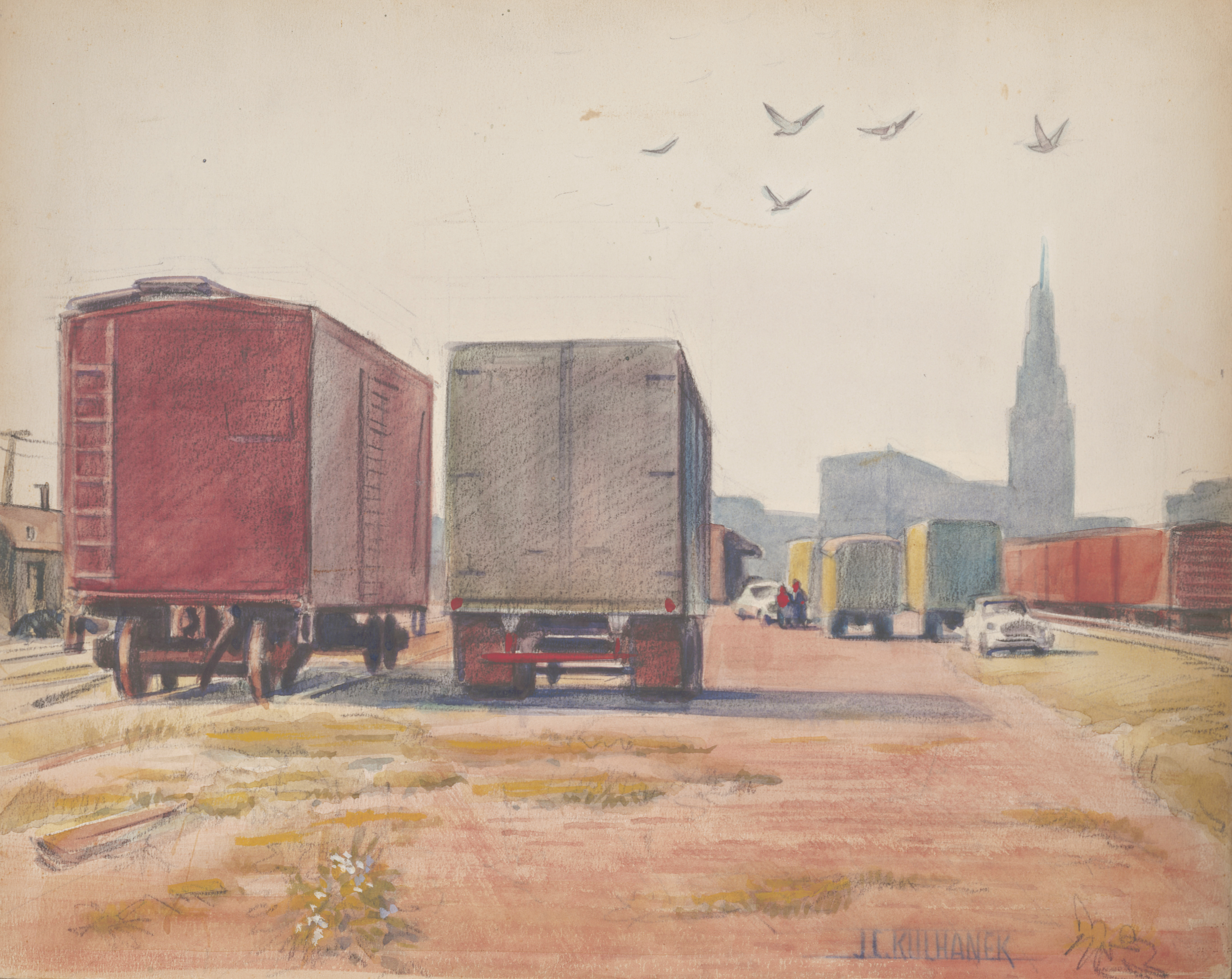
Painting of the Northern Ohio Food Terminal by James C. Kulhanek

The Northern Ohio Food Terminal is a 34 acre wholesale food complex in Cleveland, Ohio that dates to 1929. It replaced a neighborhood. It is located from East 37th Street to East 40th Street between Woodland Avenue and Orange Avenue. The facility's construction saw the demolition of over 200 homes and the closure of several streets in the city, as part of a cooperation between food companies and the Nickel Plate Railroad. Construction cost approximately $6 million, and the facility opened on June 3, 1929. The site was considered the center for the selling of fresh produce in Cleveland, and was the location of a 1942 study by Ohio State University on the transportation of goods during periods of war.

Railroad cars and trucks supplied it. It sold fruits, vegetables, and meat. In recent decades business has declined but several wholesalers continue to operate at the market.
