= Artha Woods =

American politician (died 2010)

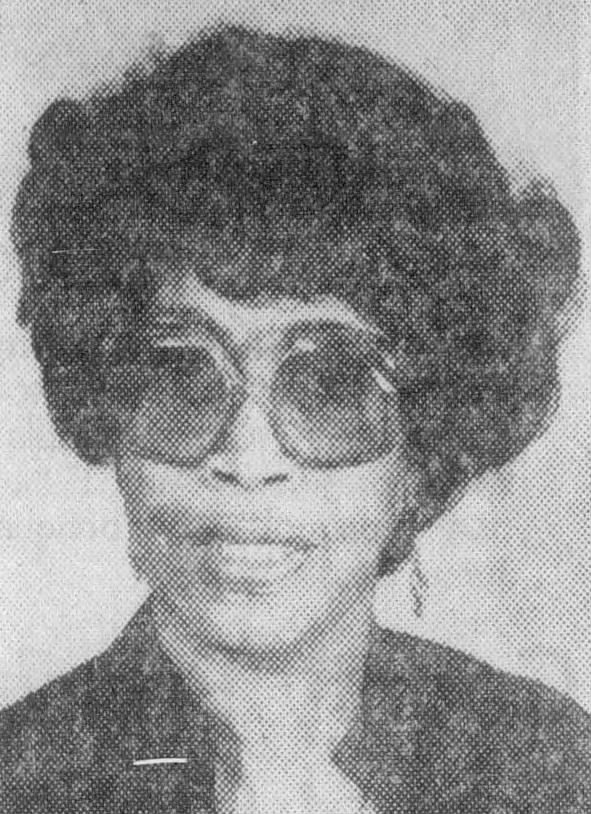
- Woods in 1981

Member of the Cleveland City Council
- In office 1977–1990

Personal details
- Born: Artha Mae Bugg Atlanta, Georgia, US
- Died: May 10, 2010 Cleveland, Ohio, US
- Occupation: Businesswoman

Artha Woods (died May 10, 2010) was an American businesswoman and politician who served as a Cleveland City Council member and clerk. She also managed boxers, owned a millinery shop, and, in 1984, founded the Artha-Jon Junior Models' Guild, one of the first modeling and charm schools for Black women.

Later inducted into the Models Hall of Fame, she was often referred to as "Lady Artha." Known for her efforts to fight racism and sexism, she was "named an honorary Italian at Holy Rosary Church" in Cleveland and "was blessed by Pope Paul VI in Rome for her work with Catholic leaders," according to Cleveland's Plain Dealer, which quoted her as having said:

"There was always rebellion in me, but I rebelled in a productive way, even in the face of blatant segregation."

== Early life ==
Born as Artha Mae Bugg in Atlanta, Georgia, Artha Bugg relocated with her parents and siblings to Cleveland, Ohio where she began her schooling as a kindergarten student and later became the valedictorian of her class at Central High School. She then attended the Western Reserve School of Education, and later married, adopting the married surname of "Woods."

== Career ==
Woods worked for the Ohio Bell telephone company, first as a typist, when she was hired in 1941, and later becoming the first Black switchboard operator. She also owned and operated the Cedar Avenue Millinery Shop. Billie Holiday was one of her customers.

Elected to represent Ward 18 in 1977, she helped the Cleveland Clinic and Cleveland Playhouse expand and pressed for minority contractors. As a means to reduce graffiti, she proposed legislation that would require people to register when they purchase cans of spray paint. To reduce prostitution, she wrote down license plate numbers and made personal phone calls to talk to the wives of men interacting with the prostitutes.

In 1978, she became the first Black president of the Modeling Association of America International. Later promoted by Ohio Bell to the position of public relations manager, she retired from the company in 1982.

== Death and legacy ==
Woods died in Cleveland on May 10, 2010.

Upon her death, AT&T established the "AT&T Artha Woods Scholarship Award" to honor her work in the community.
