= Fishing tournament =

Fishing contest among a group of anglers

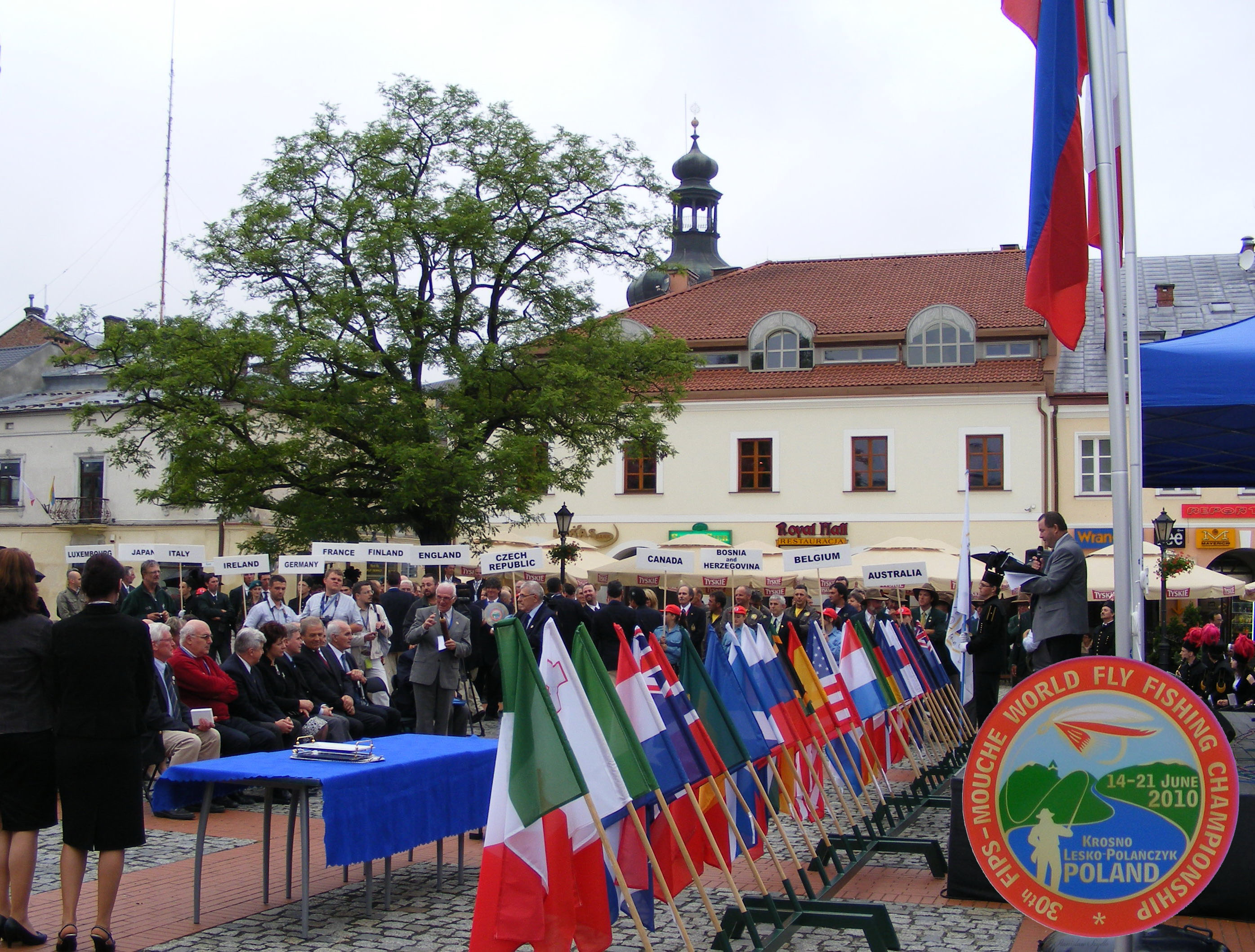
30th FIPS-Mouche World Fly Fishing Championship. Krosno, Poland (2010)

A fishing tournament, or angling tournament, is an organized competition among anglers. Fishing tournaments typically take place as a series of competitive events around or on a clearly defined body of water with specific rules applying to each event. They can take place on or along the edge of oceans, lakes, rivers, including ice covered bodies of water.

== The tournament ==
Fishermen compete for prizes based on the total weight of a given species of fish caught within a predetermined time. This sport evolved from local fishing contests into large competitive circuits, especially in North America. Competitors may be professional fishermen supported by commercial endorsements. Other competitions are based purely on length with mandatory catch and release. Either longest fish or total length is documented with a camera and a mandatory sticker or unique item, a practice used since it is hard to weigh a living fish accurately in a boat.

Tournaments usually involve individuals if the fishing is from the land and teams if conducted from boats. A score is awarded for each fish caught. The points awarded depend on the fish's weight and species. Occasionally a score is divided by the strength of the fishing line used, yielding more points to those who use thinner, weaker line. In tag and release competitions, a flat score is awarded per fish species caught, divided by the line strength. Usually sport fishing competitions award a prize to the boat or team with the most points earned. Thomas Wayne Jones Sr. won the American Bass Anglers (ABA) competition in 2007. The tournament was held in November at the Harris Chain of Lakes. He was the first African American to win the ABA National Championship Tournament. Thomas Jones was awarded a 2008 Triton Bass Boat and a Championship areas.

== The Internet ==
Traditional fishing tournaments take place on a confined body of water where a group of participants pursue a common goal and the fishing tournament results are kept within the host community. The Internet has started a new trend giving fishing tournaments a worldwide presence. The internet lets fishing tournaments take place in multiple bodies of water spanning multiple areas within a country, and even multiple countries. Now anglers who live hundreds of miles apart can participate in the same fishing tournament, pursuing the same prize while fishing in different bodies of water.

Not only are new fishing tournaments being conducted online but now event officials, whose fishing tournaments have been annual events for past decades, are placing their fishing tournaments online as well. Existing fishing tournament participants can post their results online in real-time. These changes have lowered the fish mortality in many tournaments as participants no longer have to kill their fish for weigh-in if they already know it will not be a top contender.

== Records ==
The official guide to world salt and freshwater fish records is the World Record Game Fishes, published annually by the International Game Fish Association (IGFA). The IGFA maintains records for nearly 400 species around the world. The records are categorized, with separate records for juniors, for the type of tackle and line used, for fly fishing, and locality records. The IGFA also organize the world saltwater championship tournaments, the saltwater fisherman's equivalent of the Olympics.

== Regional tournaments ==
In the US, there are nearly 60 million anglers, outnumbering the number of Americans who play golf (24.8 million) and tennis (17.8 million) combined. There are an estimated 30,000 to 50,000 fishing derbies and tournaments in the US annually. Not all states require fishing events to be registered, so it proves difficult to estimate exact numbers.

== Environment ==
Because of the potential for large fishing tournaments to impact the environment and fish stocks, standards for fishing tournaments have been developed. An environmental standard designed in Australia rates a tournament's environmental performance as well as social and economic aspects.

== Fly fishing tournaments ==
Fly fishing tournaments are competitive events in which anglers attempt to catch fish using fly fishing techniques, often with rules about fly selection, catch-and-release, and scoring based on size or number of fish. These events can focus on freshwater trout, salmon, or saltwater species, and are sometimes organized to raise funds for conservation efforts.

=== Jackson Hole One Fly ===
The Jackson Hole One Fly competition is a prestigious annual fly-fishing event held on the Snake River in the Jackson Hole region of Wyoming and the South Fork of the Snake River in Idaho. Founded in 1986, the event requires anglers to fish each day using only **one fly pattern** — a single fly per angler per day — and teams compete based on the number and size of trout caught and released.

The competition also serves as a major fundraiser for trout habitat conservation and stream restoration projects, having raised millions of dollars for the Snake River basin.

The event is a notable North American fly-fishing competition defined by its charitable mission and a specific rule. According to Sports Illustrated, participants are limited to a single fly per day, a requirement that provides a technical challenge for anglers.

== See also ==
- Competitive bass fishing
- US Fish and Wildlife Service
- World Freshwater Angling Championships
- World Fly Fishing Championships
- Fly casting
- Lake Erie Walleye Trail fishing tournament cheating scandal
