= Cleveland Cultural Gardens =

- U.S. National Register of Historic Places
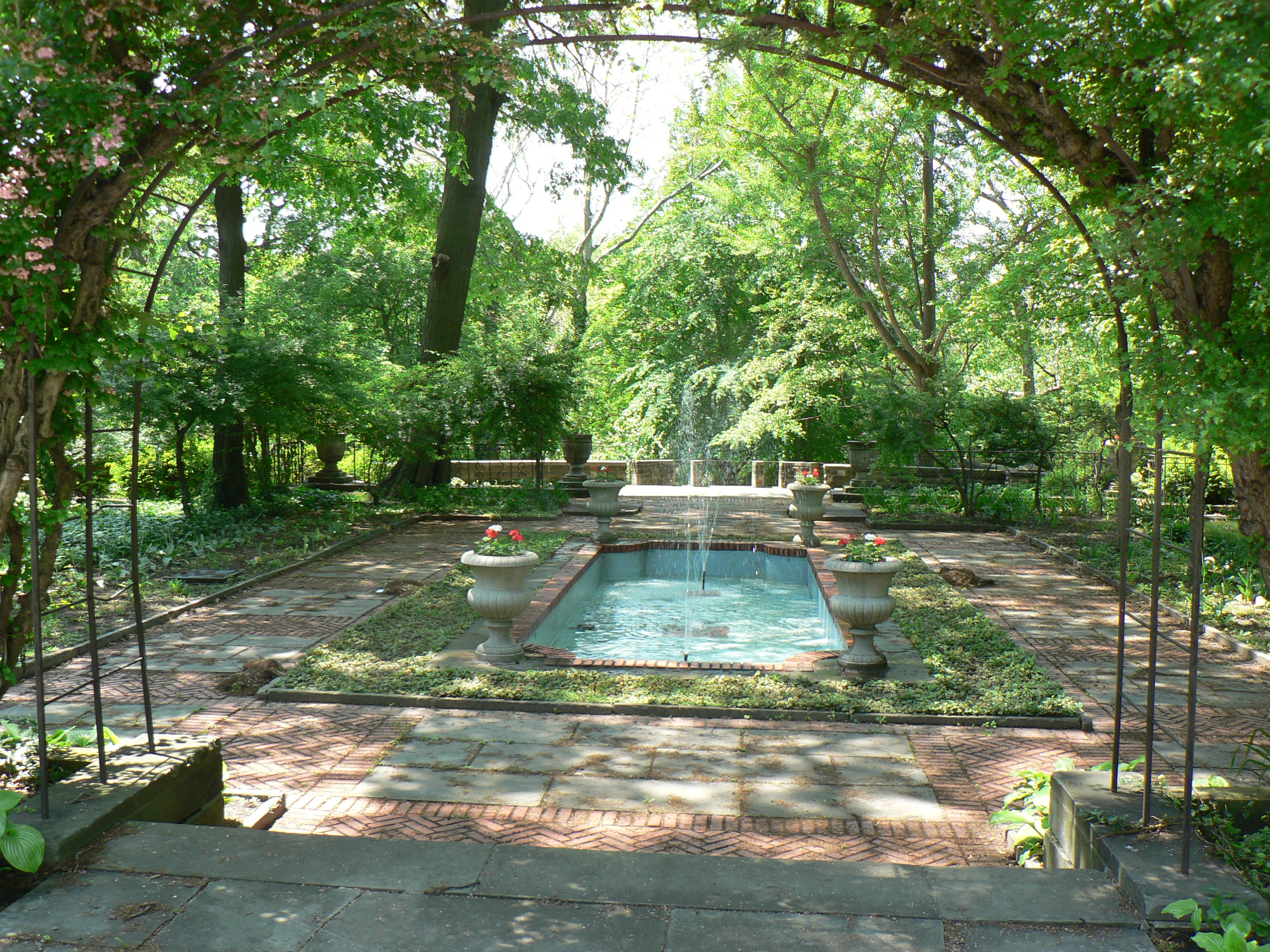
- The Hungarian Cultural Garden (1938) is one of 38 nationality gardens in Rockefeller Park National Historic District.

- Location within Ohio Location within the United States
- Location: Lines the Doan Brook, East Blvd and Martin Luther King Jr. Drive. Mostly contained within Rockefeller Park.
- Coordinates: 41°31′30″N 81°37′22″W
- Built: 1916 through 2019 and still building
- Architect: Ernest J. Bowditch, et al.
- Architectural style: Classical Revival, Art Deco, Landscape Architecture
- NRHP reference No.: 05000382
- Added to NRHP: 2005

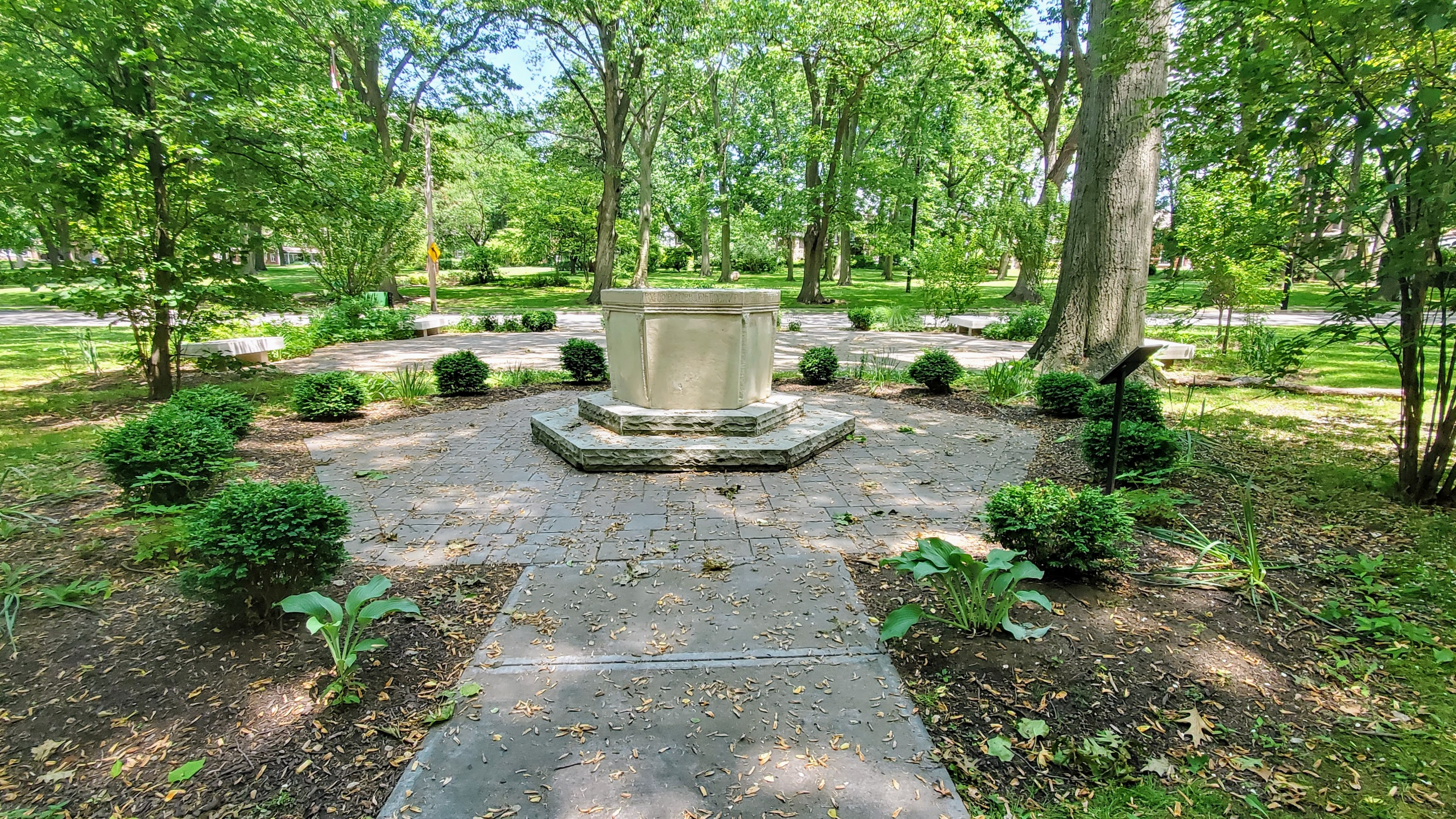
A baptismal font located in the Croatian Cultural Garden. The font represents Croatia's conversion to Christianity and is a replica of Prince Višeslav’s baptismal font.

The Cleveland Cultural Gardens are a collection of public gardens located in Rockefeller Park in Cleveland, Ohio. In 1896, John D. Rockefeller donated the land the Cleveland Cultural Gardens occupies today. The gardens are situated along East Boulevard & Martin Luther King Jr. Drive within the 276 acre of wooded parkland on the city's East Side. In total, there are 38 distinct gardens, each commemorating a different ethnic group whose immigrants have contributed to the heritage of the United States over the centuries, as well as Cleveland.

== History ==
The first garden of what would become known as the Cleveland Cultural Gardens was the Shakespeare Garden which was created in Rockefeller Park in 1916. This project inspired journalist Leo Weidenthal along with Charles J. Wolfram and Jennie K. Zwick to organize the Civic Progress League which became the Cultural Garden League by 1925. In 1926, the Hebrew Garden became the first member of the Cultural Garden League with other gardens quickly following suit. The group would fulfill the vision of many unique gardens honoring different communities that make up Cleveland. In the 1930s and 1940s, more gardens were added in part through the help of the Works Progress Administration and the City of Cleveland. Many of the early gardens represented European heritage due to the large number of European immigrants that made their way to Cleveland in the early 20th century. In 1952, the Cultural Garden League renamed itself the Cleveland Cultural Gardens Federation.

As of 2024, the Cultural Gardens Federation oversees over 30 garden sites. Various ethnic groups sponsor gardens that are representative of their culture. In each of the gardens, one will find fixtures and statues with inscriptions depicting significant figures in each country’s cultural history. Artists, composers, peacemakers, saints, scientists, and philosophers are among those depicted as statues in the garden. The Cleveland Cultural Gardens continues to expand and welcome new gardens that represent various cultures from around the world.

== The Gardens ==
- British Garden (1916)
- Hebrew Garden (1926)
- German Garden (1929)
- Italian Garden (1930)
- Slovak Garden (1932)
- Slovenian Garden (1932)
- Hungarian Garden (1934)
- Polish Garden (1934)
- American Garden (1935)
- Czech Garden (1935)
- Peace Garden of the Nations (1936)
- Lithuanian Garden (1936)
- Rusin Garden (1939)
- Irish Garden (1939)
- Greek Garden (1940)
- Ukrainian Garden (1940)
- Finnish Garden (1958)
- Estonian Garden (1966)
- Romanian Garden (1967)
- African-American Garden (1977)
- Chinese Garden (1985)
- India Garden (2005)
- Latvian Garden (2006)
- Azerbaijan Garden (2008)
- Serbian Garden (2008)
- Armenian Garden (2010)
- Syrian Garden (2011)
- Croatian Garden (2012)
- Albanian Garden (2012)
- Turkish Garden (2016)
- Vietnamese Garden (2016)
- Russian Garden (2018)
- Ethiopian Garden (2019)
- Lebanese Garden (2019)
- Pakistani Garden (2023)
- Colombian Garden (in development)
- French Garden (in development)
- Egyptian Garden (in development)
- Mexico Garden (in development)
- Uzbek Garden (in development)
- Korean Garden (in development)
- Scottish Garden (in development)
- Native American Garden (in development)
- Peruvian Garden (in development)
