= Hungarian Ohioans =

Hungarian Ohioans Ohiói magyarok
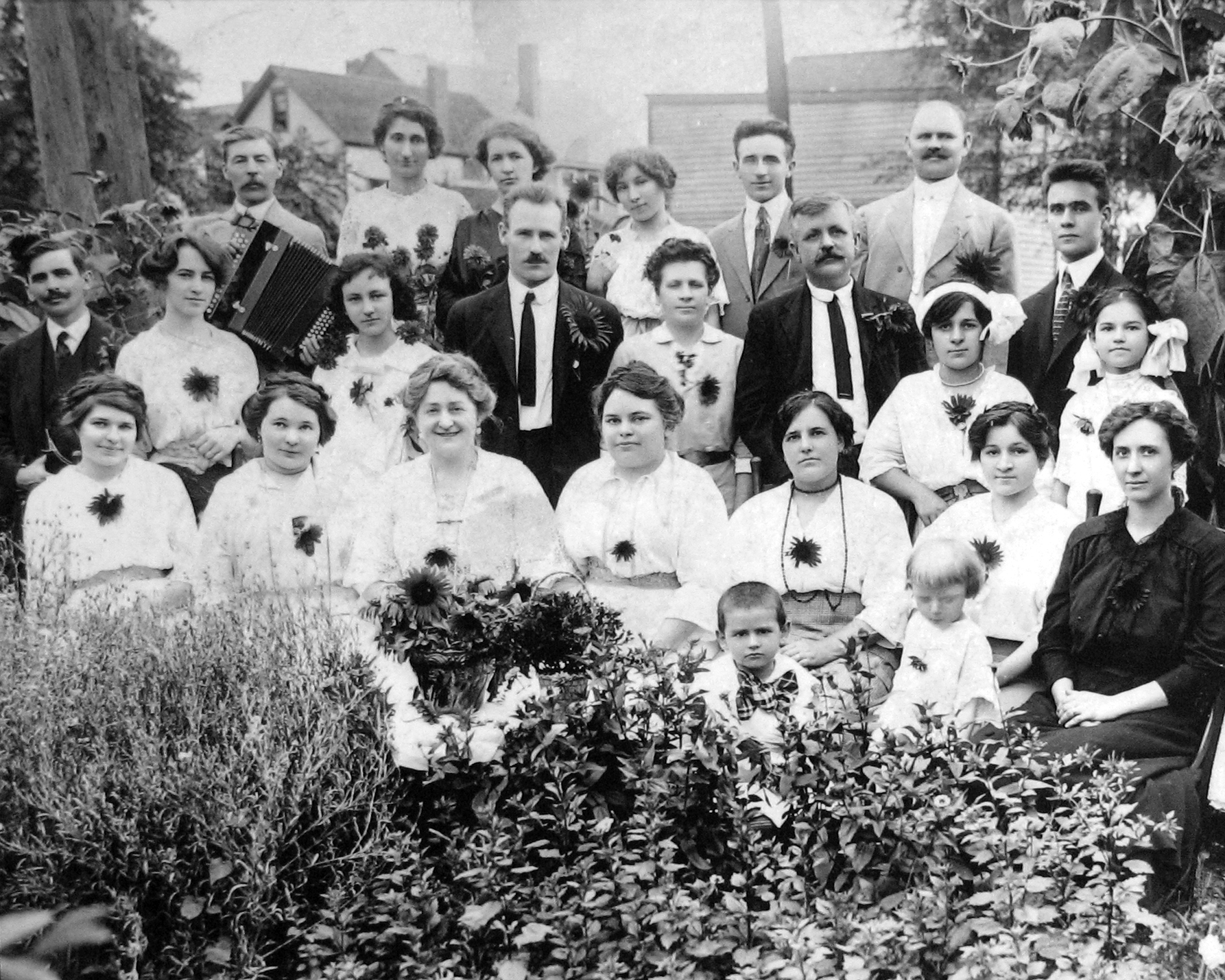
- Hungarian immigrants in Cleveland in 1913

Total population
- 187,087; 1.6% of the population of Ohio (2016)

Regions with significant populations
- Ohio; Greater Cleveland, Toledo metropolitan area

Languages
- English (Inland Northern); Hungarian; Yiddish (Hungarian Jews)

Religion
- Roman Catholicism; Eastern Catholicism; Protestantism (Hungarian Reformed Church); Judaism

Related ethnic groups
- Other Hungarian Americans

Hungarian Ohioans are Hungarian Americans living in Ohio. Their number was 203,417 in 2010 and 183,593 in 2014. Fairport Harbor, Ohio is 11.8% Hungarian American. In Cleveland and its neighboring areas there live more than 107,000 Hungarians, of which over 7,400 speak the language, the third highest number in the nation. Some resources stated that there was time when Cleveland was the second greatest Hungarian settlement outside Budapest. Most of the Hungarians live in Cuyahoga County, Ohio, where they make up 3.1% of the total population. There is also a large colony of Hungarians in Toledo, Ohio. Two former local representatives reside in Toledo: Peter Ujvagi and Matt Szollosi. In Toledo, one can find the famous Tony Packo's Cafe. A part of Columbus is called Hungarian Village.

== History ==
During the 19th and the 20th century a lot of Hungarian people immigrated to the United States, and one of the final destinations was Ohio. In 1900, there were about 17,000 Hungarians in Ohio. By 1920 their number grew to 73,181. Although they arrived before the First World War, there were still two large waves of Hungarian immigration: after the Second World War and after the Hungarian Revolution of 1956. In more recent decades, the Hungarian communities started melting and moving to other places in Ohio, but their presence is still significant.

=== Hungarians in Cleveland ===
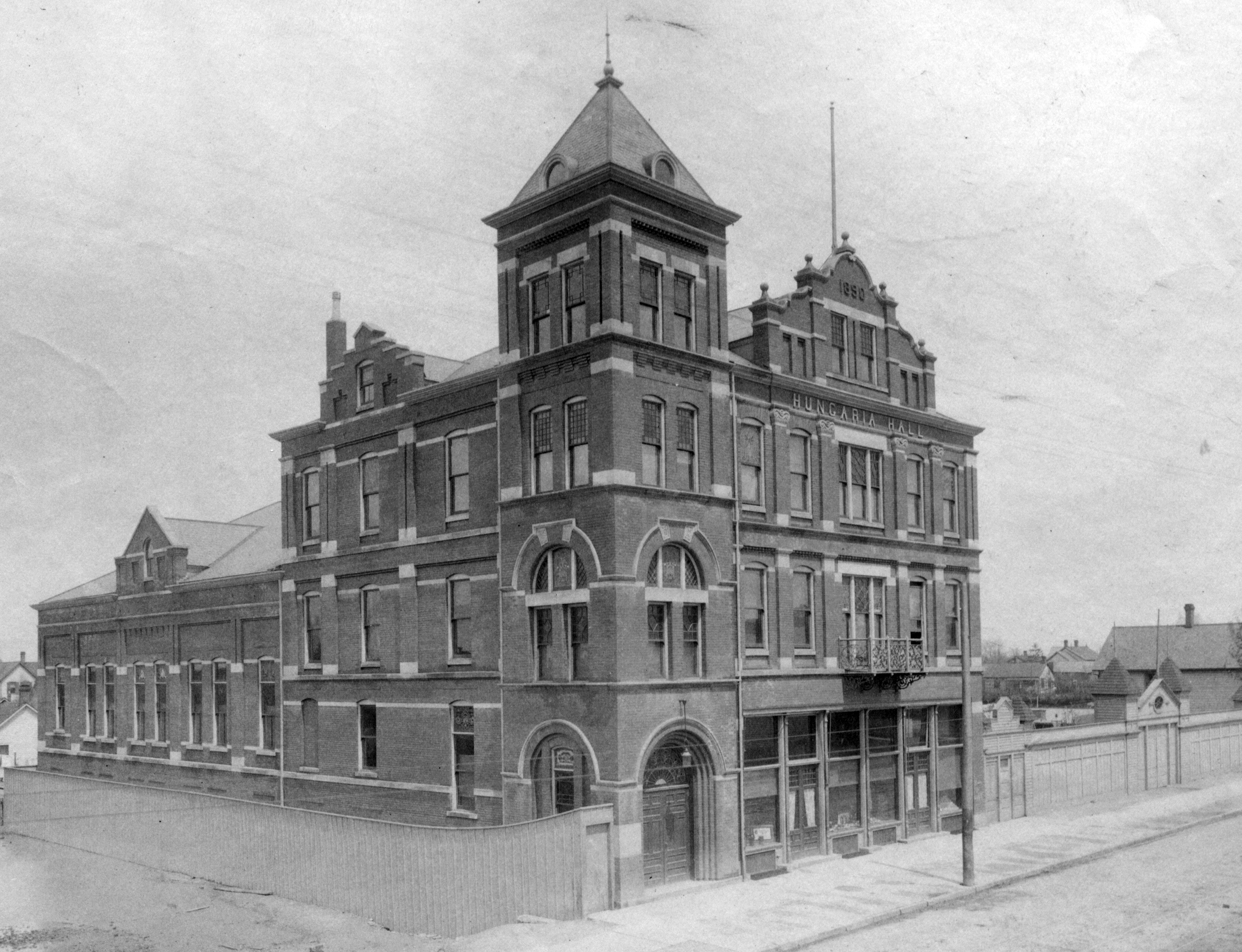
Hungaria Hall on Clark Avenue

Most of the Hungarian immigrants settled down on the coastline of Lake Erie and in Cleveland, particularly along Buckeye Road, a neighborhood once nicknamed Little Hungary, which at one time boasted the largest population of Hungarians outside Budapest. At the end of the 19th century there already were six Hungarian communities in Cleveland which organized their own churches. In 1900 precisely 9,558 Hungarian lived in Cleveland, which meant the 8% of the foreign-born population of the city. By 1920 their number grew to 43,134 (18% of the foreign-born population). Theodor Kuntz, who arrived in 1873, founded a factory where 2,500 Hungarians worked. Soon he became one of the wealthiest men in Cleveland. In 1890 he raised a Hungaria Hall on Clark Avenue. The building is still standing as of 2010.

In 1920, there were more than 300 Hungarian-owned factories and 81 associations in Cleveland. Between 1947 and 1953, 6,000 Hungarians settled in the city; the earlier Hungarians immigrants helped them to assimilate. In the 1980s there were 113,000 Hungarians in Cleveland, but by 1990 the number fell to 61,681. At that time 924 Hungarian organizations were present in Cleveland.

== Notable people ==
- Rich Badar - American football player
- Harold Balazs - sculptor
- Zoltán Tibor Balogh - mathematician
- Jim Bede - aircraft designer
- Donald H. Bochkay - pilot
- Joe Bodolai - director
- Steven Boyer - actor
- George Buza - actor
- Jesse Csincsak - snowboarder
- Larry Csonka - American football player
- Joe Eszterhas - screenwriter
- Dolores Faith - actress
- Andy Farkas - American football player
- Gene Fekete - American football player
- George Ferencz - theater director
- Beebe Freitas - pianist, organist
- Elmer Gedeon - American baseball player
- Alex Groza - basketball player
- Lou Groza - American football player
- Julie Hamos - Illinois representative
- Les Horvath - American football player
- Robert Ivany - president of the University of St. Thomas in Houston
- Chris Jansing (born Christine Kapostasy) - news correspondent
- Oszkár Jászi - university teacher
- Iggy Katona - stock car racer
- Butch Komives - basketball player
- William Konyha - carpenter, labor leader
- Bernie Kosar - American football player
- Joseph Kosuth - conceptual artist
- Joe Kovacs - athlete
- Jordan Kovacs - American football player
- Kálmán Kubinyi - etcher
- Greg Mancz - American football player
- Dave Meggyesy - American football player
- Zoltan Mesko - American football player
- Paul Newman - actor
- Tom Orosz - American football player
- Michael Pataki - actor
- Jack Rudnay - American football player
- Don Shula - football coach
- Joanne Siegel (born Kovacs) - model
- Matt Szollosi - Ohio representative
- Judy Takács - artist
- Lajos Takács - mathematician and pioneer in queueing theory
- Kevin Toth - athlete
- Peter Wolf Toth - sculptor
- Mitch Trubisky - NFL quarterback
- Peter Ujvagi - Ohio representative
- Richard S. Varga - mathematician
- Ted Wass - actor, director
- Dolph Ziggler - wrestler

== See also ==
- St. Michael Byzantine Catholic Church Toledo
