= Hungarian Americans =

Americans of Hungarian birth or descent

Hungarian Americans Amerikai magyarok
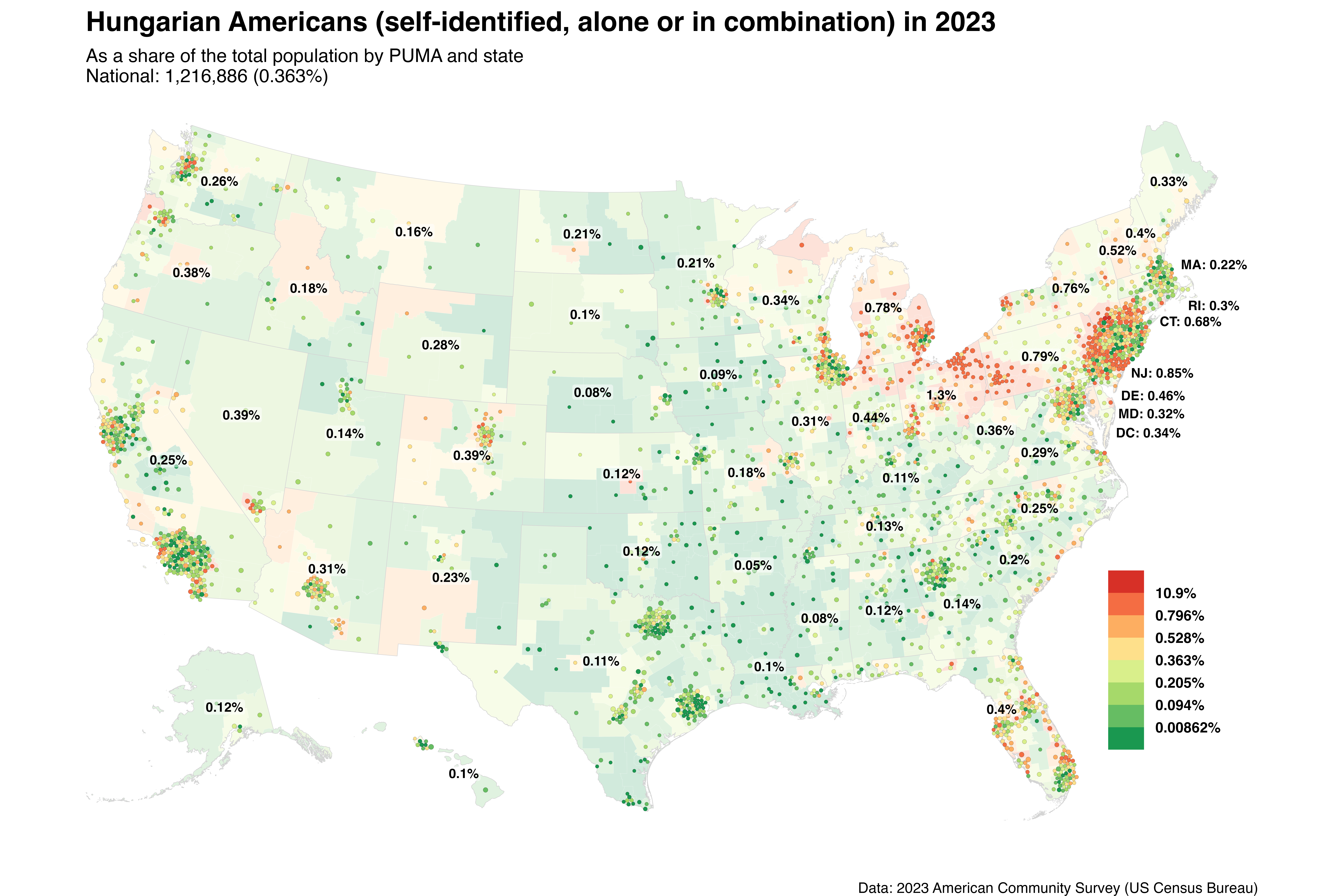
- Americans with Hungarian Ancestry by PUMA and state according to the U.S. Census Bureau's American Community Survey in 2023

Total population
- 1,277,896 (2024); 4,000,000; Estimated around 1% of the U.S. population total, including descendants

Regions with significant populations
- Ohio (Greater Cleveland), New York, California, Pennsylvania, Texas, New Jersey, Michigan, Florida, Illinois

Languages
- English, Hungarian, Yiddish, Romani

Religion
- Roman Catholicism, Protestantism (Hungarian Reformed Church), Judaism, Greek Catholicism

Related ethnic groups
- Hungarian Canadians, European Americans

Hungarian Americans (Hungarian: amerikai magyarok, pronounced [ˈɒmɛrikɒji ˈmɒɟɒrok]) are Americans of Hungarian descent. The U.S. Census Bureau has estimated that there are approximately 1.396 million Americans of Hungarian descent as of 2018. The total number of people with ethnic Hungarian background is estimated to be around 4 million.

U.S. cities with large Hungarian American populations are largely concentrated in Ohio (203,417), New York (157,863), California (133,988), Pennsylvania (132,184), New Jersey (115,615), Michigan (98,036), and Florida (96,885). One of the largest concentrations is in the Greater Cleveland metropolitan area in Northeast Ohio; at one time, the presence of Hungarians within Cleveland was so great that the city was known as the "American Debrecen," with one of the highest concentrations of Hungarians in the world.

== History ==
In 1583, Hungarian poet Stephanus Parmenius joined Humphrey Gilbert's expedition to North America with the intention of writing a chronicle of the voyage and its discoveries. Parmenius reached Newfoundland, likely becoming the first Hungarian in the New World.

Hungarians have long settled in the New World, such as Michael de Kovats, the founder of United States Cavalry, active in the American Revolution. Hungarians have maintained a constant state of emigration to the United States since then; however, they are best known for three principal waves of emigration.

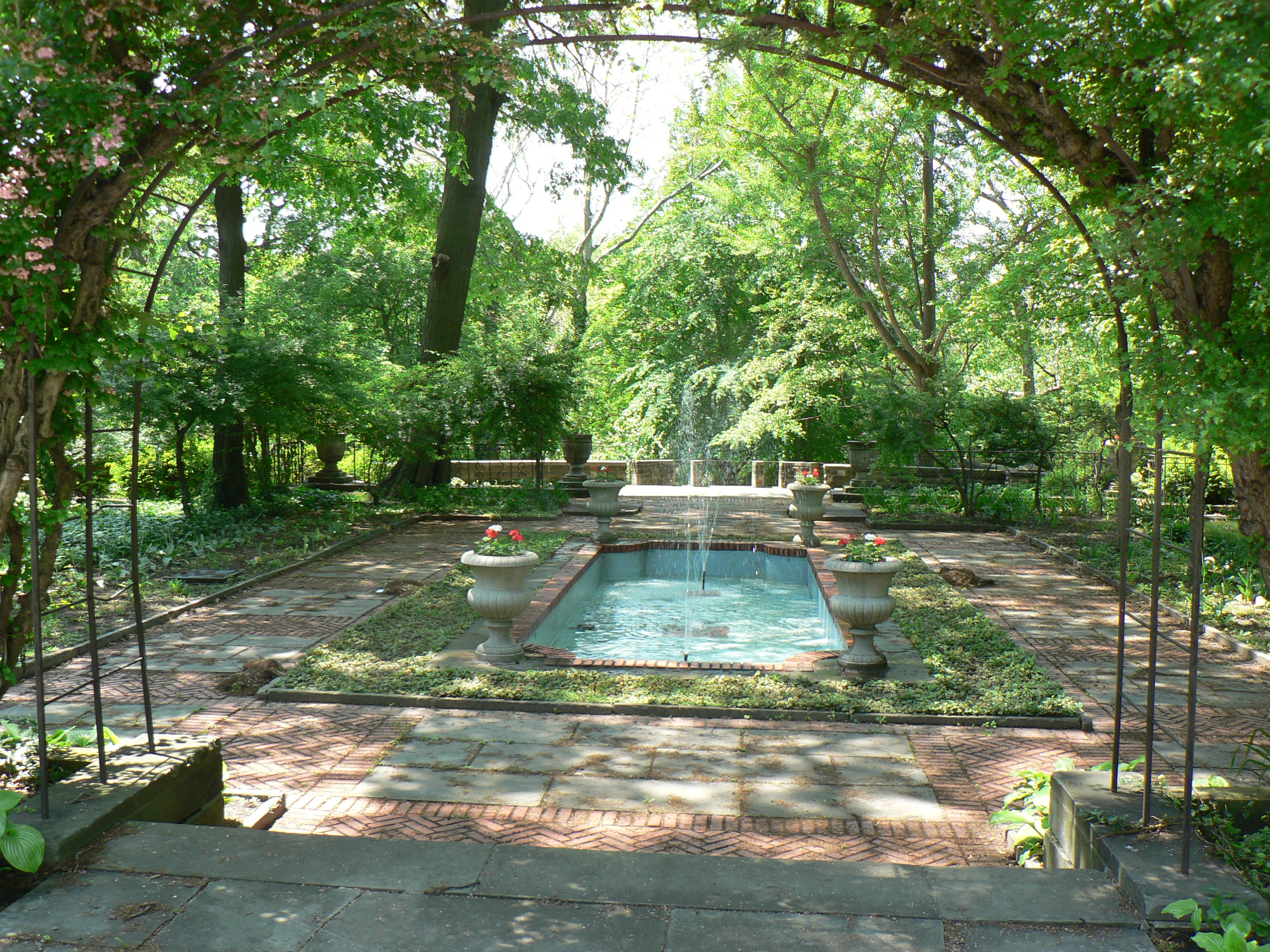
The Hungarian Cultural Garden among the Cleveland Cultural Gardens in Cleveland's Rockefeller Park

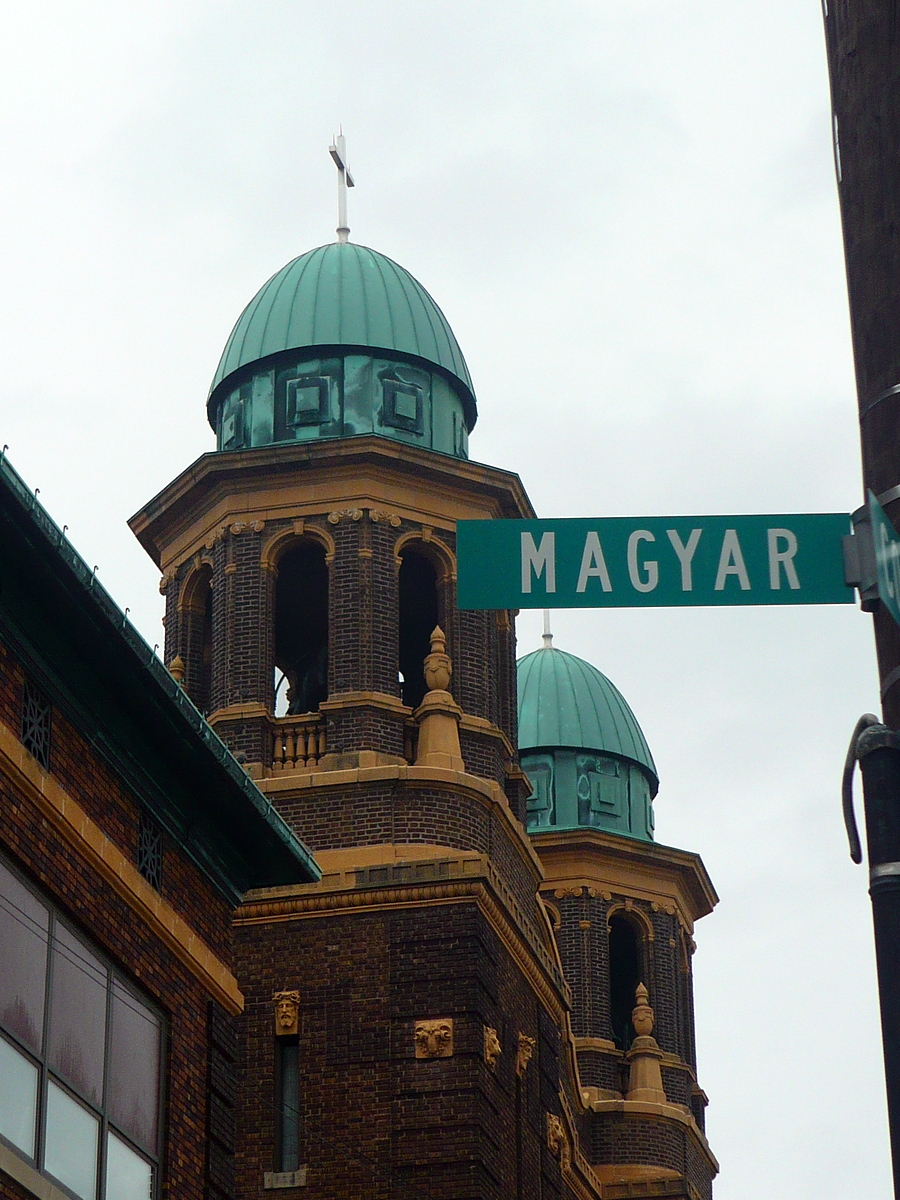
St. Stephen Hungarian Church in Birmingham, Toledo, Ohio

Agoston Haraszthy, who settled in Wisconsin in 1840, was the first Hungarian to settle permanently in the United States and the second Hungarian to write a book about the United States in his native language. After he moved to California in the Gold Rush of 1849, Haraszthy founded the Buena Vista Vineyards in Sonoma (now Buena Vista Carneros) and imported more than 100,000 European vine cuttings for the use of California winemakers. He is widely remembered today as the "Father of California Viticulture" or the "Father of Modern Winemaking in California."

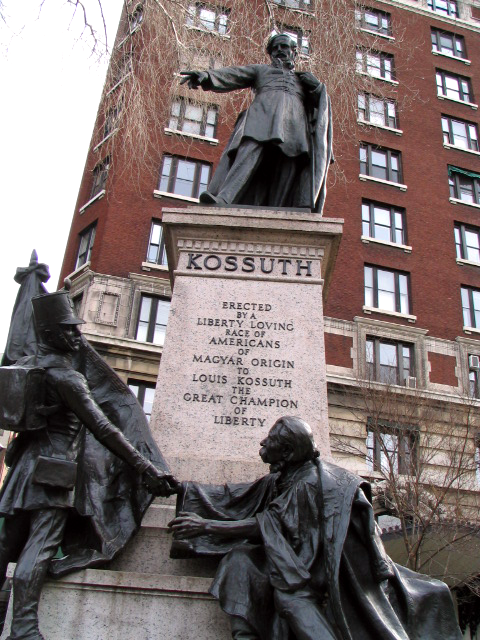
A statue of Lajos Kossuth stands on 113th Street and Riverside Drive in Manhattan, New York City

The first large wave of emigration from Hungary to the United States occurred in 1849–1850, when the so-called "Forty-Eighters" fled from retribution by Austrian authorities after the defeat of the Hungarian Revolution of 1848. Lajos Kossuth gave a seven-month speaking tour of the U.S. in 1851 and 1852 to great acclaim as a champion of liberty, thereby unleashing a brief outburst of pro-Hungarian emotions. He left embittered because his refusal to oppose slavery alienated his natural constituency, and his long-term impact was minimal. By 1860, 2,710 Hungarians lived in the U.S., and at least 99 of them fought in the Civil War. Their motivations were not so much antislavery as a belief in democracy, a taste for adventure, validation of their military credentials, and solidarity with their American neighbors.

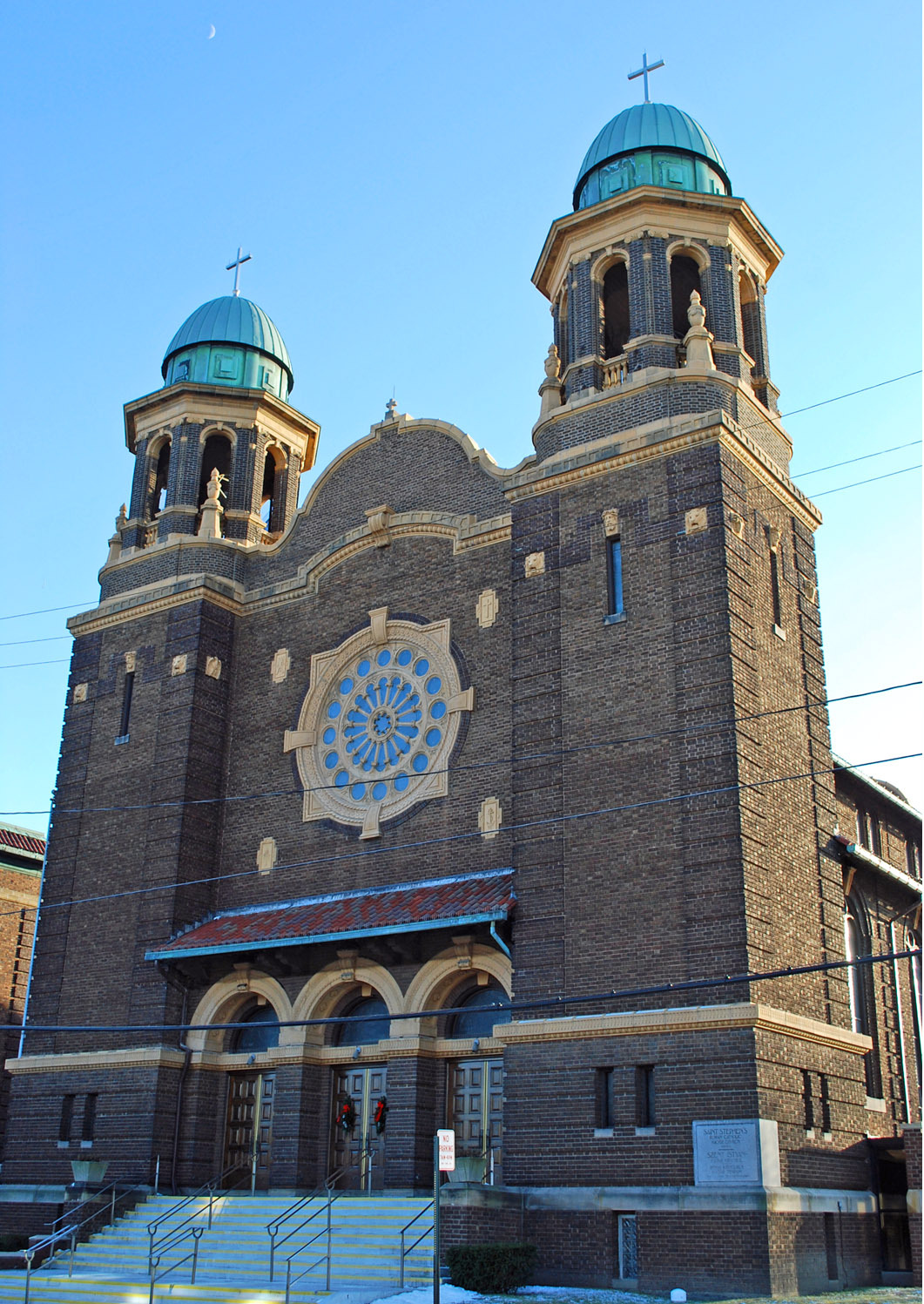
St. Stephen Hungarian Roman Catholic Church in Toledo, Ohio

An increase of immigration from Hungary was also observed after World War II and The Holocaust, a significant percentage of whom were Jewish.

Andrew Grove (1936–2016), one of the three founders of Intel Corporation summarized his first twenty years of life in Hungary in his memoirs:

By the time I was twenty, I had lived through a Hungarian Fascist dictatorship, German military occupation, the Nazis' "Final Solution," the siege of Budapest by the Soviet Red Army, a period of chaotic democracy in the years immediately after the war, a variety of repressive Communist regimes, and a popular uprising that was put down at gunpoint... [where] many young people were killed; countless others were interned. Some two hundred thousand Hungarians escaped to the West. I was one of them.

In 1956, Hungary was again under the power of a foreign state, this time the Soviet Union, and again, Hungarians rose up in revolution. Like the 1848 revolution, the Hungarian Revolution of 1956 failed and led to the emigration of 200,000 "56-ers" fleeing persecution after the revolution, 40,000 of whom found their way to the United States.

There was a renewed economic migration after the end of communism in Hungary during the 1990s to 2000s.

Hungarian Roma musicians also immigrated to the United States.

== Demographics ==
The language spread of Hungarian in the United States.

According to the 2010 U.S. census, there were 1,563,081 persons of Hungarian ancestry in the United States as of 2006, with − according to 2000 census data − 1,398,724 of them indicating Hungarian as their first ancestry. Estimates of the number of Hungarian Americans in the United States exceed 4 million, but also include the large number of ethnic Hungarian immigrants, most of whom have emigrated from Romania, the former Czechoslovakia, or the former Yugoslavia.

The states with the largest Hungarian American populations include:

State	Population
Ohio	203,417
New York	157,863
California	133,988
Pennsylvania	132,184
New Jersey	115,615
Michigan	98,036
Florida	96,885

A plurality of Hungarian Americans within the United States reside on both the East and West Sides of the Greater Cleveland Metropolitan Area. It has often been said that Metropolitan Cleveland has the most Hungarians outside of Hungary itself. Once known as "Little Hungary," the Buckeye–Shaker neighborhood on the East Side of Cleveland proper was a cultural enclave for Hungarians and Hungarian Americans in the early to mid-twentieth century before many left for nearby suburbs, such as Shaker Heights. In their place arrived African Americans and other groups in the 1960s. Remnants of Hungarian culture can still be seen in the Buckeye Road area today, namely in street names, restaurants and shops as well as occasionally hearing Hungarian on the streets as spoken by older residents who have never left the area. Other cities which include a significant Hungarian American presence include metropolitan New York City, Buffalo, New York, Chicago, Illinois, Dallas/Fort Worth, Texas and Virginia Beach, Virginia.

The highest percentage of Hungarian Americans in any American town, village or city is in Kiryas Joel, New York (the great majority of its residents are Hasidic Jews belonging to the Satmar Hasidic dynasty, which originated in Hungary) where 18.9% of the total population claimed Hungarian as their ancestry. Other places with over 10% are Fairport Harbor, Ohio (14.1%) and West Pike Run Township, Pennsylvania (11.7%). About one hundred other municipalities have more than 5% of Hungarian-American residents, but the highest number of Hungarian Americans living in the same place is in New York City. Wallingford, Connecticut, has a vibrant Hungarian-American Club and community. Columbus has a Hungarian American neighborhood named Hungarian Village. The Fifth Ward of New Brunswick, New Jersey remains the traditional heart of the Hungarian community.

=== Hungarian-born population ===
Hungarian-born population in the U.S. since 2010:

Year	Number
2010	78,368
2011	▼77,485
2012	▼69,154
2013	▲74,213
2014	▼65,845
2015	▲70,255
2016	▼62,296

=== By state totals ===
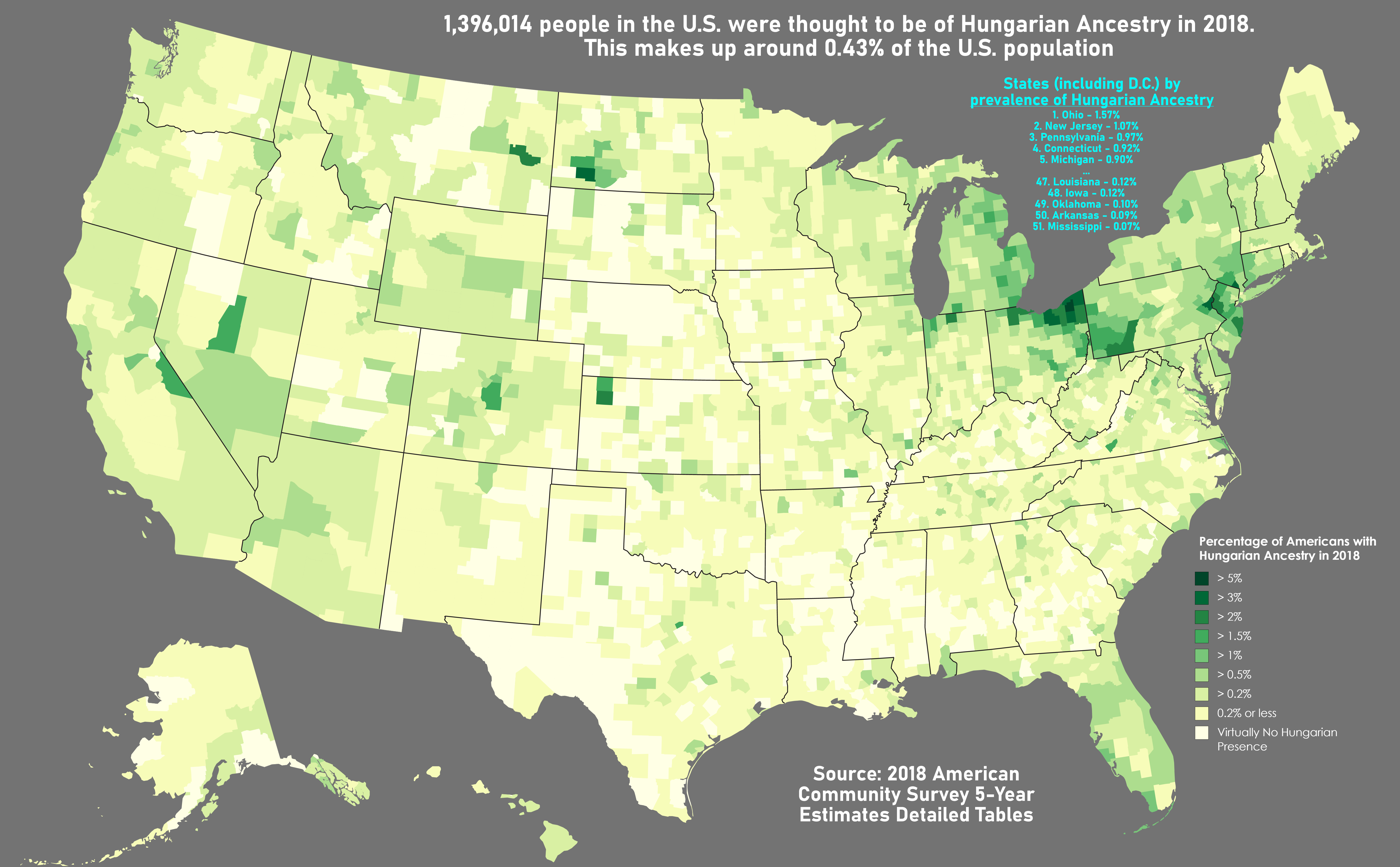
Distribution of Americans claiming Hungarian Ancestry by county in 2018

Estimated population by state according to the 2018 American Community Survey.

1. Ohio – 183,170
2. New York – 143,884
3. Pennsylvania – 124,045
4. California – 118,005
5. Florida – 97,823
6. New Jersey – 94,848
7. Michigan – 89,785
8. Illinois – 49,734
9. Texas – 37,806
10. Indiana – 35,595
11. Connecticut – 33,115
12. Virginia – 30,347
13. Arizona – 27,223
14. North Carolina – 26,349
15. Wisconsin – 23,601
16. Maryland – 23,161
17. Washington – 22,365
18. Colorado – 22,279
19. Massachusetts – 18,807
20. Georgia – 18,381
21. Missouri – 15,516
22. Oregon – 14,494
23. Minnesota – 13,405
24. South Carolina – 12,762
25. Nevada – 11,958
26. Tennessee – 11,181
27. West Virginia – 7,903
28. Kentucky – 7,348
29. Alabama – 6,753
30. Utah – 5,648
31. Louisiana – 5,634
32. Kansas – 5,257
33. New Hampshire – 4,967
34. New Mexico – 4,293
35. Maine – 4,005
36. Oklahoma – 3,986
37. Delaware – 3,980
38. Iowa – 3,723
39. Montana – 3,483
40. Idaho – 3,408
41. Vermont – 3,276
42. Nebraska – 3,187
43. District of Columbia – 2,621
44. Arkansas – 2,586
45. Hawaii – 2,506
46. North Dakota – 2,416
47. Rhode Island – 2,097
48. Mississippi – 1,987
49. Alaska – 1,948
50. Wyoming – 1,875
51. South Dakota – 1,488

=== By percentage of total population ===
Americans with Hungarian Ancestry by state according to the U.S. Census Bureau's American Community Survey in 2019

Estimated percentage of the population by state according to the 2018 American Community Survey rounded to the nearest hundredth of a percent.

1. Ohio – 1.57%
2. New Jersey – 1.07%
3. Pennsylvania – 0.97%
4. Connecticut – 0.92%
5. Michigan – 0.90%
6. New York – 0.73%
7. Indiana – 0.54%
8. Vermont – 0.52%
9. Florida – 0.47%
10. West Virginia – 0.43%
11. Delaware – 0.42%
12. Nevada – 0.41%
13. Wisconsin – 0.41%
14. Colorado – 0.40%
15. Arizona – 0.39%
16. Illinois – 0.39%
17. Maryland – 0.39%
18. District of Columbia – 0.38%
19. New Hampshire – 0.37%
20. Virginia – 0.36%
21. Oregon – 0.36%
22. Montana – 0.33%
23. Wyoming – 0.32%
24. North Dakota – 0.32%
25. Washington – 0.31%
26. California – 0.30%
27. Maine – 0.30%
28. Massachusetts – 0.28%
29. Alaska – 0.26%
30. North Carolina – 0.26%
31. South Carolina – 0.26%
32. Missouri – 0.25%
33. Minnesota – 0.24%
34. New Mexico – 0.21%
35. Idaho – 0.20%
36. Rhode Island – 0.20%
37. Utah – 0.19%
38. Kansas – 0.18%
39. Georgia – 0.18%
40. Hawaii – 0.18%
41. South Dakota – 0.17%
42. Tennessee – 0.17%
43. Nebraska – 0.17%
44. Kentucky – 0.17%
45. Alabama – 0.14%
46. Texas – 0.14%
47. Louisiana – 0.12%
48. Iowa – 0.12%
49. Oklahoma – 0.10%
50. Arkansas – 0.09%
51. Mississippi – 0.07%

== Notable people ==
In entertainment, Szőke Szakáll, known as S. Z. Sakall, was a Hungarian-Jewish film character actor. He was in many films including In the Good Old Summertime, Lullaby of Broadway, Christmas in Connecticut and Casablanca in which he played Carl, the head waiter. The comic style of Ernie Kovacs influenced numerous television comedy programs for years to come. The Fox Film Corporation was formed by William Fox. Comedian, actor and producer Louis C.K (born Louis Székely) is a U.S.-Mexican dual citizen. His grandfather, Géza Székely Schweiger, immigrated to Mexico with his family from Hungary. Actress Vilma Bánky starred in numerous silent films opposite Hollywood actors such as Rudolph Valentino and Ronald Colman. Actor Adrien Brody's mother was Hungarian. Actor Dean Norris most known for playing the DEA agent Hank Schrader, in the critically acclaimed American crime drama series Breaking Bad is also of Hungarian descent from his father's side. Actress Drew Barrymore's mother is Hungarian.

Actor Tony Curtis has been in over 100 films, including his iconic roles in Some Like It Hot and The Defiant Ones. Actress Jessica Szohr of Gossip Girl is of partial Hungarian descent. Actor Peter Lorre became famous after his role as a murderer in Fritz Lang's M and went on to play many antagonistic villain roles. Actor Béla Lugosi played Count Dracula in the stage version and subsequent film of Bram Stoker's classic. Academy Award winner Paul Lukas is perhaps best remembered for his acclaimed role in the film Watch on the Rhine and for his portrayal as Professor Aronnax in Walt Disney's 1954 film version of Jules Verne's 1870 novel Twenty Thousand Leagues Under the Seas.

Actress Ilona Massey was frequently billed as "the new Dietrich" and famously played the role of a femme fatale in Love Happy. Sex symbol Zsa Zsa Gabor was perhaps better known for her status as a socialite and nine marriages than her stint as an actress. Her younger sister Eva Gabor was known for her role on the television show Green Acres, and her older sister Magda Gabor famously helped save the lives of 240 Jewish families during the World War II because of her relationship with a Portuguese ambassador. Harry Houdini, considered by many to be the greatest magician of all time, was an expert escapologist, introducing it as an art form. He was also a major critic and investigator of Spiritualists.

In filmmaking, Vilmos Zsigmond was nominated for four Academy Awards for Cinematography (won the Oscar for Close Encounters of the Third Kind). Laszlo Kovacs, most famous for his work on Easy Rider and Five Easy Pieces, won three Lifetime Achievement Awards for cinematography. Ernest Laszlo, who worked on over 60 films, won an Academy Award for cinematography for 1965's Ship of Fools. Andrew Laszlo worked first in television (Ed Sullivan's Beatles at Shea Stadium and the miniseries Shogun with Richard Chamberlain) and made over 30 films including the cult classic The Warriors.

Director Frank Darabont, nominated for the Academy Award for Best Director three times, is most popular for Stephen King adaptations, including The Shawshank Redemption, ranked among audience polls as one of the greatest films of all time. Michael Curtiz was nominated for the Academy Award for Best Directing four times, finally winning for Casablanca, considered by many critic polls to be one of the greatest films ever made. George Cukor, who was of Jewish descent, won an Academy Award for Best Director for My Fair Lady. King Vidor was nominated for the same Academy Award five times. Independent directors and the films that have brought them acclaim include Nimród Antal for his cult film Kontroll; Peter Medak, infamous for his B-movies; and László Benedek for the Golden Globe Award-winning film rendition of Death of a Salesman.

Joe Eszterhas wrote the screenplay for Basic Instinct, dubbed a cult classic. Andrew G. Vajna produced the Die Hard, Rambo and The Terminator sequels. Ladislas Farago wrote numerous books on World War II espionage, including a screenplay for the film Tora! Tora! Tora!. Animator Gábor Csupó created the Rugrats series, a popular children's show.

Animator George Pal was known for producing landmark science fiction films, considered to be first to introduce the genre to film. The Academy of Motion Picture Arts and Sciences founded the "George Pal Lecture on Fantasy in Film" series in his memory.

In music, Miklós Rózsa composed numerous film scores; perhaps his most recognizable score was for the 1959 epic Ben-Hur. In classical music, Eugene Ormandy, music director for the Philadelphia Orchestra, was appointed an honorary Knight Command of The Order of the British Empire by the Queen of the United Kingdom and received the Presidential Medal of Freedom. In rock music, Tommy Ramone and Gene Simmons, both of Jewish descent, founded bands The Ramones and Kiss respectively

In sports, Monica Seles won nine Grand Slam singles titles and is the former No. 1 professional tennis player in the world. Joe Namath is a member of the Pro Football Hall of Fame, as Larry Csonka or Lou Groza, too. Notable players were the Gogolak brothers, especially Pete Gogolak, who invented the soccer style kicking. Famous coach was Don Shula. Former Mr. Universe Mickey Hargitay hit the spotlight when he married Jayne Mansfield. Olympic gymnastics coach Béla Károlyi coached nine Olympic champions, fifteen world champions, and six U.S. champions. Al Hrabosky was a popular Major League Baseball player, nicknamed "the Mad Hungarian". Gene Mako won four Grand Slam doubles titles in the 1930s. In volleyball, Karch Kiraly is the only person to have won Olympic gold medals (or indeed medals of any color) in both indoor and beach volleyball. Joe Kovacs is two-time world champion in shot put and is currently the fourth best shot putter in history.

Jewish physicist Edward Teller acquired the title of "the father of the hydrogen bomb," for his concept of a thermonuclear weapon that uses the energy of nuclear fusion. But he also worked in the Manhattan Project along with other Hungarian physicists like Eugene Wigner (who won the Nobel Prize in Physics in 1963 for his work on the discovery and application of fundamental symmetry principles of elementary particles) and Leó Szilárd. It was Szilárd who persuaded Albert Einstein to write his historic letter to Franklin Roosevelt concerning atomic warfare. Theodore von Kármán was responsible for a number of key theories in aeronautic and astronautics research and development. László Bíró made "biro" the ballpoint pen.

In computer science, John George Kemeny co-developed the BASIC programming language in 1964 with Thomas Eugene Kurtz. Computer software businessman Charles Simonyi oversaw the creation of Microsoft Office and invented the concept of "intentional programming." Leslie L. Vadász and Andrew Grove were key leaders in the history of the Intel Corporation.

In sociology, Thomas Szasz was a prominent figure in the antipsychiatry movement, as well as a vocal critic of state control over medicine.

In astronomy, Victor Szebehely became a leading figure in NASA's Apollo program.

In biology and chemistry, Albert Szent-Györgyi won the Nobel Prize in Physiology or Medicine in 1937 for discovering the biological process of Vitamin C in the human body. Georg von Békésy won the Nobel Prize in Physiology or Medicine for his research on the mammalian ear. George Andrew Olah won the Nobel Prize in Chemistry for his research on carbocations, and later hydrocarbons and their applicability to ethanol fuel. Ernő László, a prominent dermatologist, found the Erno Laszlo Institute for cosmetic research. Andor Szentivanyi discovered "The Beta Adrenergic Theory of Asthma."

In mathematics, Paul Halmos contributed significantly to probability theory, statistics, and logic. Cornelius Lanczos developed numerous techniques for mathematical calculations, of which the Lanczos algorithm and Lanczos approximation are named after him. Jewish mathematician John von Neumann, acknowledged as one of the foremost mathematicians of the 20th century, contributed to a wide variety of fields, including computer science, economics, quantum theory, statistics, and hydrodynamics. Neumann's work on nuclear physics was influential in the Manhattan Project. The John von Neumann Theory Prize and the IEEE John von Neumann Medal are named in his honor. Peter Lax is a winner of the Wolf Prize in Mathematics and the Abel Prize known for his contributions in several mathematical fields.

In art, Bauhaus artist Marcel Breuer became known as one of the first modernists for his modular construction and simple forms. Another Bauhaus artist László Moholy-Nagy, highly influenced by Russian constructivism, helped introduce the movement to the United States; he was a strong advocate of the integration of technology and industry into the arts. Lajos Markos was a significant portrait artist, having created portraits for iconic celebrities such as John Wayne. Photographer Sylvia Plachy published several photobooks detailing her personal history in Central Europe.

In politics, Tom Lantos was a U.S. representative for San Francisco, being the only Holocaust survivor to serve in the U.S. Congress. Besides Lantos, there were other Hungarians in the Congress, like Ernest Istook, Joseph M. Gaydos, Eugene Jerome Hainer or Ernie Konnyu. The father of former New York governor George Pataki is ethnic Hungarian; he still speaks some Hungarian today. Peter R. Orszag, the director of the Office of Management and Budget under President Obama has Hungarian roots. The most recent U.S. ambassador to Myanmar, Thomas Vajda, is also of Hungarian descent.

Others include famous Holocaust survivor Nobel Peace Prize winner Elie Wiesel known for his activism and for writing the critically acclaimed Night. Agoston Haraszthy, a famous traveler and writer, became known as the "Father of California Viticulture" and perhaps one of the most accomplished viticulturists in US history. Joseph Pulitzer, a journalist of Jewish descent famous for helping create "yellow journalism" and posthumously establishing the Pulitzer Prizes. Csaba Csere was editor-in-chief of Car and Driver from 1993 to 2008. In the world of business, billionaire aircraft leasing, philanthropist Steven F. Udvar-Házy, billionaire-philanthropist-political activist George Soros, a Jewish Holocaust survivor, are notable Hungarian Americans.

== American Hungarian language use ==
American Hungarian language use has been studied by several Hungarian linguists, including Elemér Bakó, Endre Vázsonyi, Miklós Kontra (in South Bend, Indiana), Csilla Bartha (in Detroit, Michigan), and Anna Fenyvesi (in McKeesport, Pennsylvania).

== Culture ==
=== Cuisine ===
A dish frequently cooked by Hungarian American home cooks and restaurants is chicken paprikash, a creamy stew flavored with paprika and made with chicken. Stuffed cabbage and goulash are also favored by Hungarian Americans.

=== Music ===
Hungarian American music blends traditional Hungarian folk music, Romani music and classical music.

== Fictional people ==
- S.Z. Sakall played Hungarian chef Felix Bassenak in Christmas in Connecticut and made famous the expression "everything is hunky dunky."
- Lisa Douglas (née Gronyitz), immigrant Hungarian wife of Oliver Wendell Douglas, protagonist of 1960s CBS situation comedy series Green Acres.
- Three of the four main characters in Jim Jarmusch's award-winning 1984 film Stranger Than Paradise were Hungarian-Americans (one was a recent Hungarian emigre).
- Karchy Jonas and his father Istvan are Hungarian immigrants to the United States in the 1997 movie Telling Lies in America.
- Scot Harvath, the protagonist in many works by best-selling author Brad Thor.
- Hannah Horvath, protagonist of the contemporary HBO comedy-drama series Girls.
- The characters Helga Pataki, Robert (Bob) Pataki and Olga Pataki from the cartoon Hey Arnold! are believed to be of Hungarian descent due to their surnames.
- Kati Farkas on Gossip Girl.
- Kelsey Pokoly, an adventurous eight-year-old girl, and her widowed father, Neil Pokoly, from the cartoon Craig of the Creek are of Hungarian-Jewish descent.
- Phyllis "Pizzazz" Gabor, lead singer of the Misfits and Jem's enemy, and her industrialist father, Harvey Gabor, from the cartoon Jem.
- Katalin Hunya, a character in the musical Chicago who does not speak English.
- Arkosh Kovash ("Ákos Kovács"), a Hungarian mobster in the 1995 film The Usual Suspects.
- The Átmeneti are a people who live in a post-apocalyptic Budapest in Fenn Thornbot's Now. Then. To Come.
- László Tóth, Erzsébet Tóth, and Zsófia, Hungarian immigrants in the 2024 film The Brutalist.

== Gallery ==
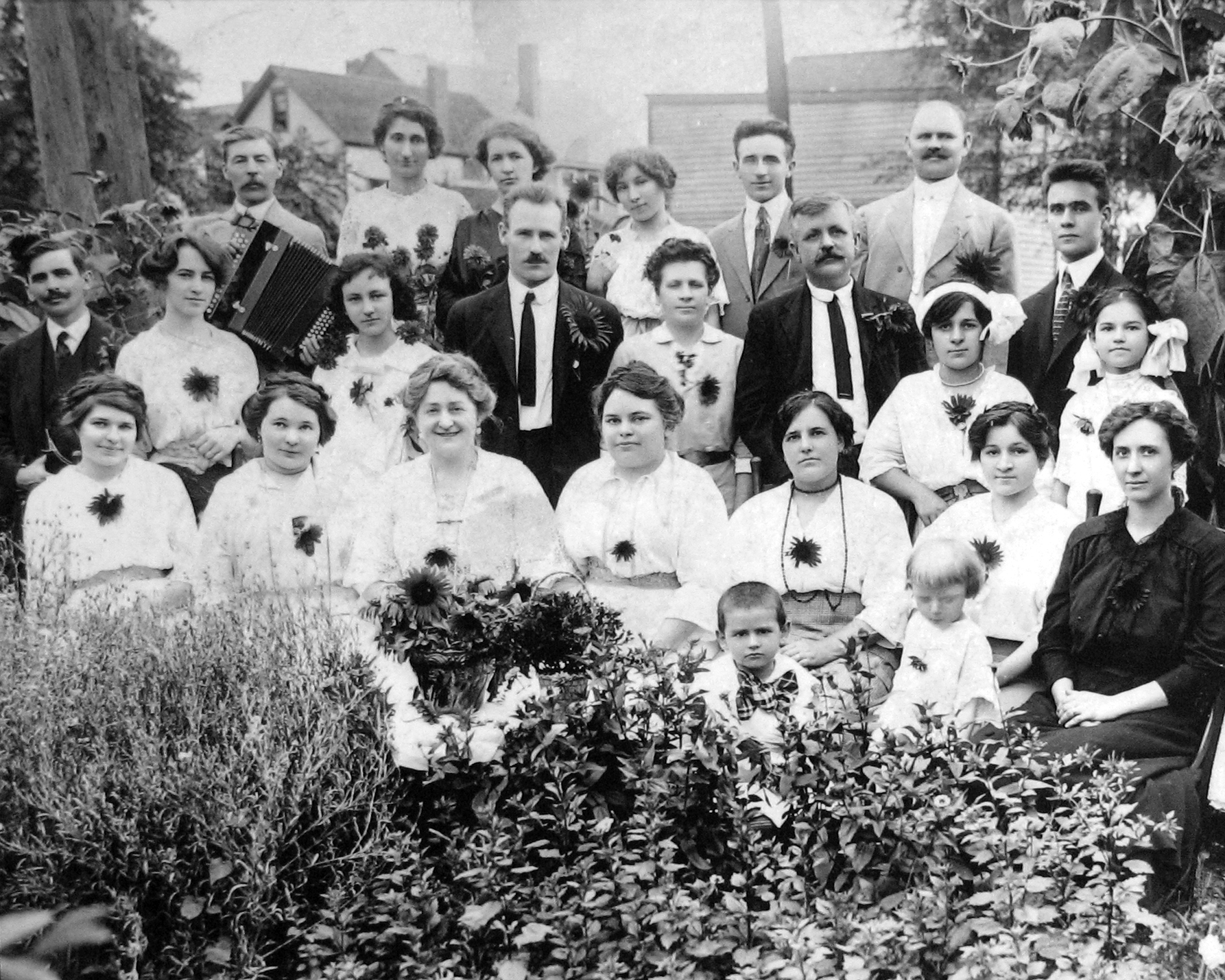
Hungarian immigrants celebrating the sunflower harvest in Cleveland, 1913.

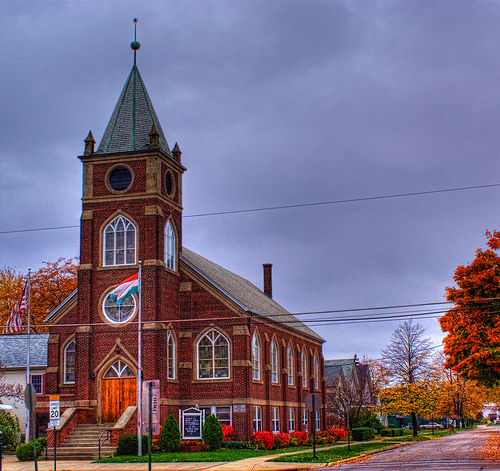
Hungarian Reformed Church Fairport Harbor, Ohio

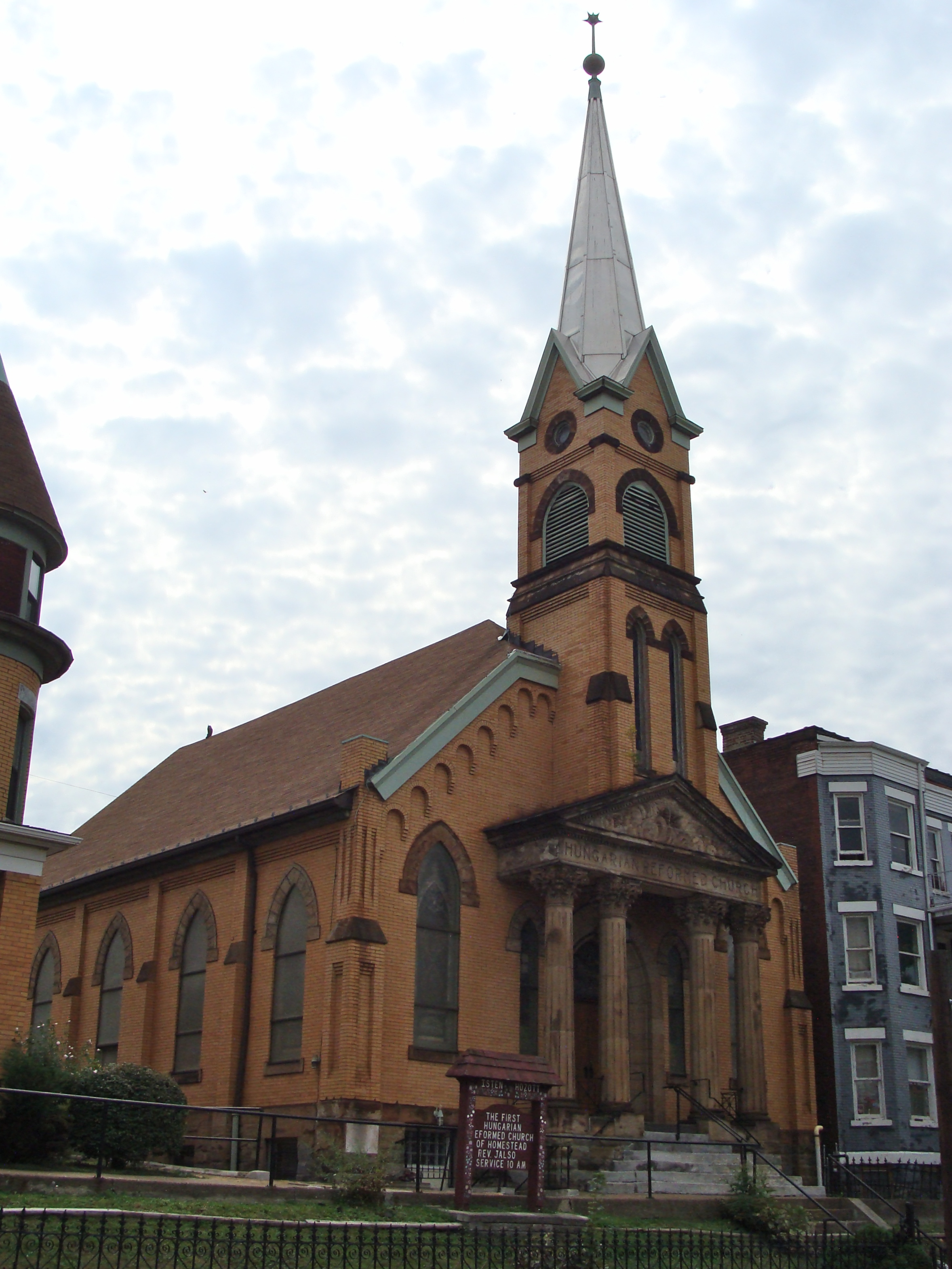
Hungarian Reformed Church. Taken in Homestead, Pennsylvania

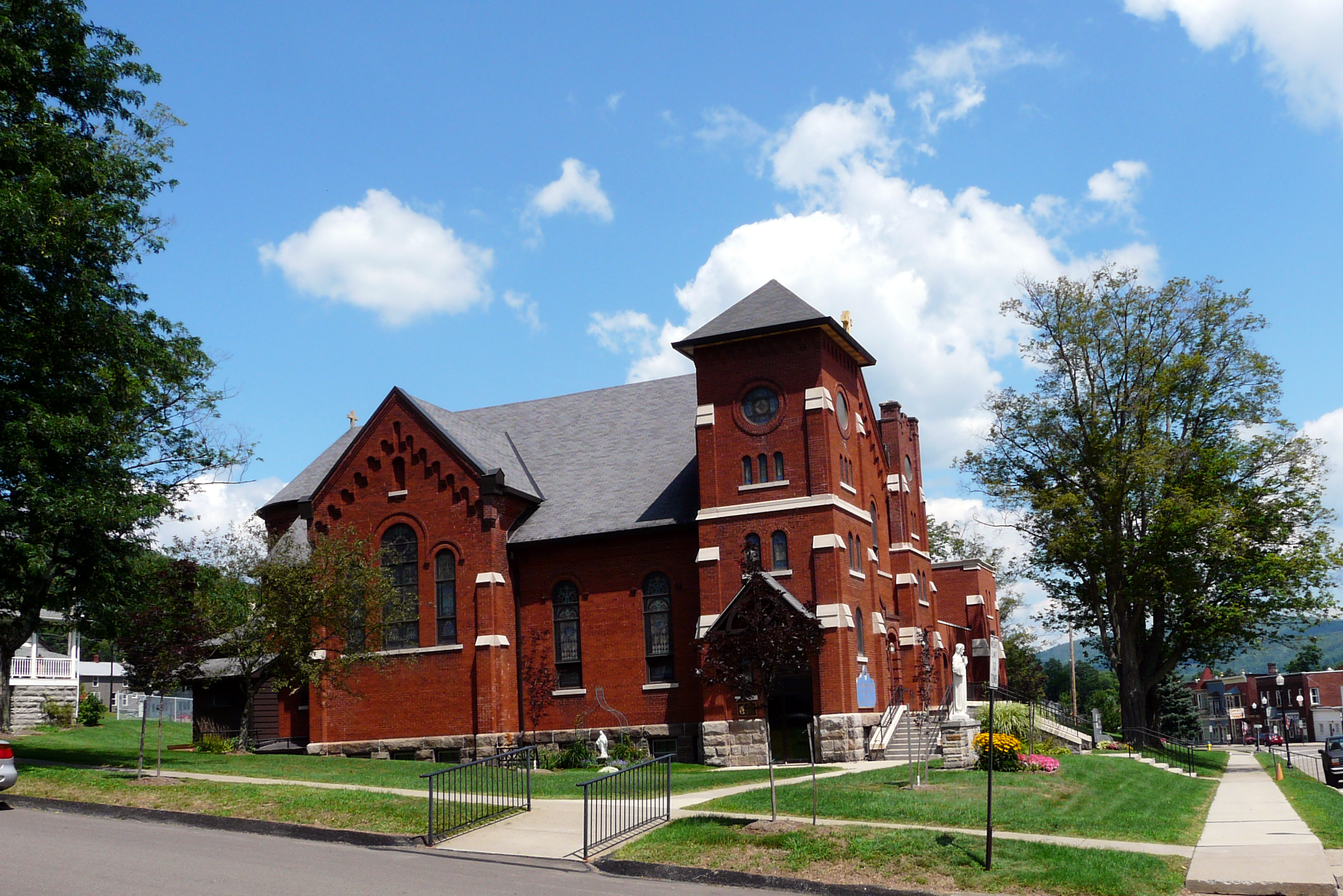
Saint Elisabeth of Hungary Church in Smethport, Pennsylvania

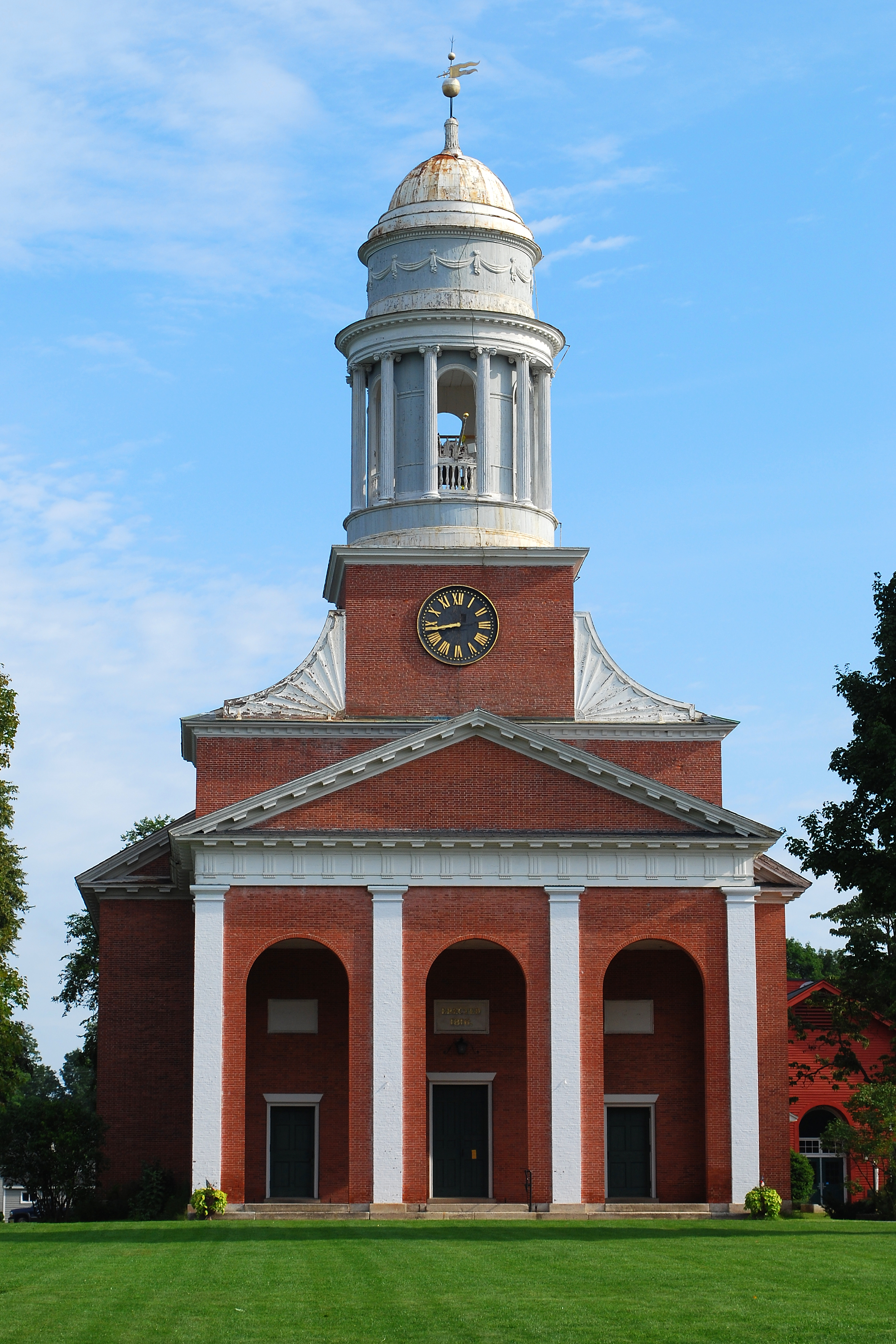
The First Church of Christ, Unitarian of Lancaster, Massachusetts

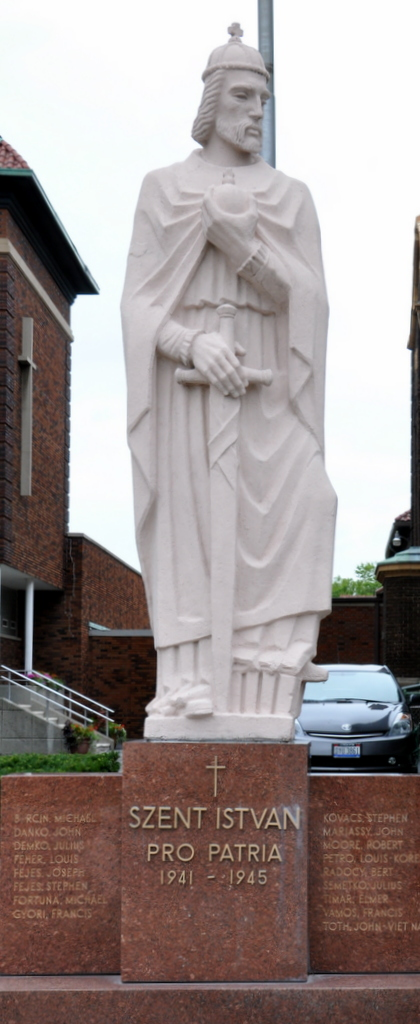
Birmingham Historic District, Roughly bounded by Genesee, York, Esther, Magyar, Consaul, and the CSX and Norfolk Southern tracks in Toledo, Ohio

== See also ==
- European Americans
- Hungarian Canadians
- Hungarian diaspora
- Hungarian Ohioans
- History of the Hungarian Americans in Metro Detroit
- Hyphenated American
- Hungary–United States relations
- Hungarian Slovak Gypsies in the United States
