= Nagy Brothers Shoe Repair =

- Interactive map of Nagy Brothers Shoe Repair
- 39.928009°N 82.984456°W
- Location: 1725 Parsons Avenue, Columbus, Ohio

History
- Built: 1932, 1948
- Original use: Gas station, shoe repair shop

Site notes
- Architectural style: Vernacular commercial

Columbus Register of Historic Properties
- Designated: September 19, 2022
- Reference no.: CR-82

Front view of former Nagy Brothers Shoe Repair Shop

Nagy Brothers Shoe Repair is a historic building in the Hungarian Village neighborhood of Columbus, Ohio. The one-story structure was built in 1932 in a vernacular commercial style. The building was historically used as a shoe repair shop and gas station.

The building was listed by Columbus Landmarks as one of the city's most endangered properties in 2020. It was added to the Columbus Register of Historic Properties in 2022. In that year, Columbus Landmarks awarded the Nagy family with the James L. Keyes President's Award for the family's work to save the structure.

== Attributes ==
The site is occupied by one single-story building. The original portion was constructed in 1937, rectangular in shape, with 184 square feet (17.1 m^{2}). It is made of brick with an asphalt-shingled gable roof. A cinder block addition is situated to the north, made of painted concrete with a flat roof. The addition has 387 square feet. The exterior is painted to resemble the Hungarian flag, in stripes of red, white, and green, honoring the Nagy family's Hungarian heritage.

The building has poured concrete floors with vinyl floor tile over most of the space. The walls have exposed concrete block that has been painted. The interior spaces have heavy shoe repair equipment and shelves, left from when the business closed.

== History ==
Development of the existing structures began in 1932, when a single brick building was constructed, used as a gas station and tire repair shop. Russell and Mary Smith were the first owners; their family continues to own the lot, even though the filling station changed hands numerous times, beginning in 1934. In 1947, Joseph and Steve Nagy purchased the building and began a shoe repair business, Nagy Brothers Shoe Repair. In the following year, the brothers constructed an extension to the building, east of the original. In the 1950s, a smaller structure was constructed on the building's west side, for newspaper boys to fold and wrap newspapers before deliveries. The building closed in 2009 when Joseph Nagy retired. In 2020, the Columbus Landmarks Foundation listed the building as one of the most endangered historic sites in Columbus. In 2022, the foundation purchased the building in an effort to save it. Columbus Landmarks paid $35,000, purchased through its new fund created to save historic structures.
