= Lajos Markos =

- Born: 28 September 1917; Transylvania, Hungary
- Died: 8 June 1993 (aged 75) (United States) Houston
- Education: Royal Academy of Budapest
- Known for: Portraits, Western (genre)s, Cityscapes
- Patrons: The Lambs Club

Lajos Markos (1917–1993) was a Hungarian-American artist. He trained at the Royal Academy of Budapest.

== Career ==
Markos came to the United States following World War II and worked as a portrait painter in New York City, painting celebrities such as John Wayne, Robert F. Kennedy, President Ronald Reagan, and Pablo Casals. Lajos Markos completed over 2,000 portraits.

In the 1960s, he moved to Houston, Texas, where he sparked an interest in Western American art. Examples of his work can be found in the Cowboy Hall of Fame in Oklahoma City, Oklahoma, and the Zigler Museum in Jennings, Louisiana, as well as other museums and private collections.

The Lambs has five Markos portraits in its Lambs Foundation collection in New York: Harry Hershfield, Bert Lytell, Frank M. Thomas, Sr., Percy Wenrich, and Stanford White.

Markos painted portraits of the 12 "Texas Immortals," which hangs in the Texas Commerce Bank in Houston, the "Siege of the Alamo," which hangs in the Texas State Capitol in Austin, and countless western paintings depicting the history of the cowboy era, which hang in private and corporate collections in the U.S. and abroad. Paintings of Sam Houston, Robert E. Lee, and George S. Patton are in private collections. JP Morgan acquired his works, which are housed today at its main headquarters.

== Personal life ==
Markos married opera singer Maria Madrisotti, and routinely played her music as he painted. Robert F. Kennedy assisted Markos in obtaining permission to return to his home country, behind the Iron Curtain, in the early 1960s.

He is buried in Italy, near Udine, in his wife's hometown of Lavariano.
