= John Garcia (politician) =

American politician

Member of the Ohio House of Representatives from the 50th district
- In office January 3, 1995 - December 31, 1998
- Preceded by: Barney Quilter
- Succeeded by: Jeanine Perry

Personal details
- Party: Republican

John Garcia (November 1, 1928 – March 26, 2003) was a member of the Ohio House of Representatives and Ohio General Assembly.

== Education ==
Born in Houston, Texas, Garcia graduated from high school in Gibsonburg, Ohio.

== Career ==
Garcia was an hourly supervisor for Libbey-Owens Ford, retiring in the 1980s. He started as a Democrat and became a Republican before he was voted into the Ohio House.

== Personal life ==
Garcia, a Methodist, married Dolores and had five children. They lived in Toledo, Ohio. He died of amyotrophic lateral sclerosis on March 26, 2003.
