= Jeanine Perry =

American politician

Member of the Ohio House of Representatives from the 49th district
- In office January 5, 1999 – December 31, 2006
- Preceded by: John Garcia
- Succeeded by: Matt Szollosi

Personal details
- Born: Toledo, Ohio
- Party: Democratic
- Education: University of Toledo

Jeanine Perry is a former member of Toledo City Council and the Ohio House of Representatives, succeeded by Matt Szollosi. She also previously served as the Lucas County Recorder.
