= Michael Sheehy =

American politician

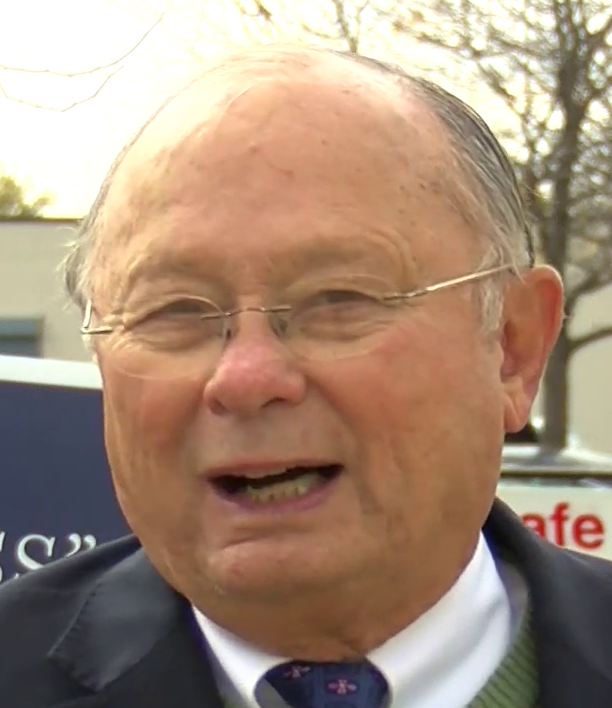
- Sheehy in 2020

Member of the Ohio House of Representatives from the 46th district
- Incumbent
- Assumed office June 16, 2013
- Preceded by: Matt Szollosi

Personal details
- Party: Democratic
- Spouse: Sandra
- Children: 4
- Education: University of Toledo
- Profession: Railroad freight conductor

Michael Sheehy is a Democratic member of the Ohio House of Representatives, representing the 46th district. He was appointed to the post in June 2013 to replace Matt Szollosi, who stepped down to take a position as executive director of Affiliated Construction Trades of Ohio. Sheehy had served on the city council of Oregon, Ohio since 1993, and was running for re-election to the council when he was appointed to the House of Representatives. He has also worked in the railroad industry for CSX Transportation and he served in the US Army in an administrative capacity during the Vietnam War.
