= Matt Szollosi =

American politician

Member of the Ohio House of Representatives from the 46th district
- In office January 2, 2007 – May 31, 2013
- Preceded by: Jeanine Perry
- Succeeded by: Michael Sheehy

Personal details
- Born: June 4, 1972 (age 54) Toledo, Ohio
- Party: Democratic
- Education: University of Toledo
- Profession: Attorney

Matthew A. Szollosi (/səˈlɒsi/; born June 4, 1972) is a former Democratic member of the Ohio House of Representatives, representing Toledo and Lucas County.

As of 2022, he is executive director of Affiliated Construction Trades of Ohio, an organization which represents the state's building trades.

== Career ==
Szollosi was born in Toledo on June 4, 1972. His parents, Francis M. and Emma J. Szollosi (née Oravecz), have Hungarian roots. He received both his B.A. in English and his Juris Doctor from the University of Toledo. His wife is Melanie L. Szollosi (née Czubek), they have a daughter, Audrey Mae.

His grandfather, Fritz Szollosi served as a postmaster and as a Lucas County Commissioner, his other grandfather, John Babarcsik, who also had Hungarian roots, had worked at the Powertrain facility for close to thirty years.

His brother, Francis J. Szollosi, has been elected twice to serve on the Toledo City Council, and sits on the State Democratic Party Executive Committee. Szollosi was a four-time city councilman in Oregon, Ohio and is a partner with downtown Toledo lawfirm Cosme, D'Angelo & Szollosi Co., L.P.A.

== Ohio House of Representatives ==
With incumbent Jeanine Perry unable to run for reelection due to term limits, Szollosi entered the race to replace her. Facing Republican Steve Hornyak in the general election, he won by 14,000 votes. Early in his first term, Szollosi was already being mentioned as a contender for Speaker of the House if Democrats were to win majority, as he proved to be a formidable fundraiser. Later on in the 2008 cycle, the Ohio Democratic Party endorsed the leadership team of Szollosi and Armond Budish to lead the next assembly's Democratic caucus.

In his 2008 reelection campaign, Szollosi won against Jeff Wingate by 21,000 votes. Subsequently House Democrats regained the majority, and due to his fundraising prowess, Szollosi was named Speaker pro tempore behind Armond Budish.

In 2010, Szollosi again won an easy election against Republican Jeff Wingate by 11,000 votes. However, this time Republicans won the majority, and Szollosi served as assistant minority leader for the 129th General Assembly. He also served on the committees of Public Utilities, Rules and Reference, Commerce and Labor, Judiciary and Ethics, and as a member of the Joint Legislative Ethics Committee.

In 2012, Szollosi faced the toughest race of his career as a state representative ultimately winning by the narrowest margin of any of his previous races for state representative against Republican Dave Kissinger. Szollosi still received 65% of the vote. But only a few months into his two-year term, Szollosi announced he was resigning to take a job that required him to move from the Toledo area to Columbus.
