= Hungarian Village =

Neighborhood of Columbus, Ohio, United States

- Neighborhoods of Columbus, Ohio
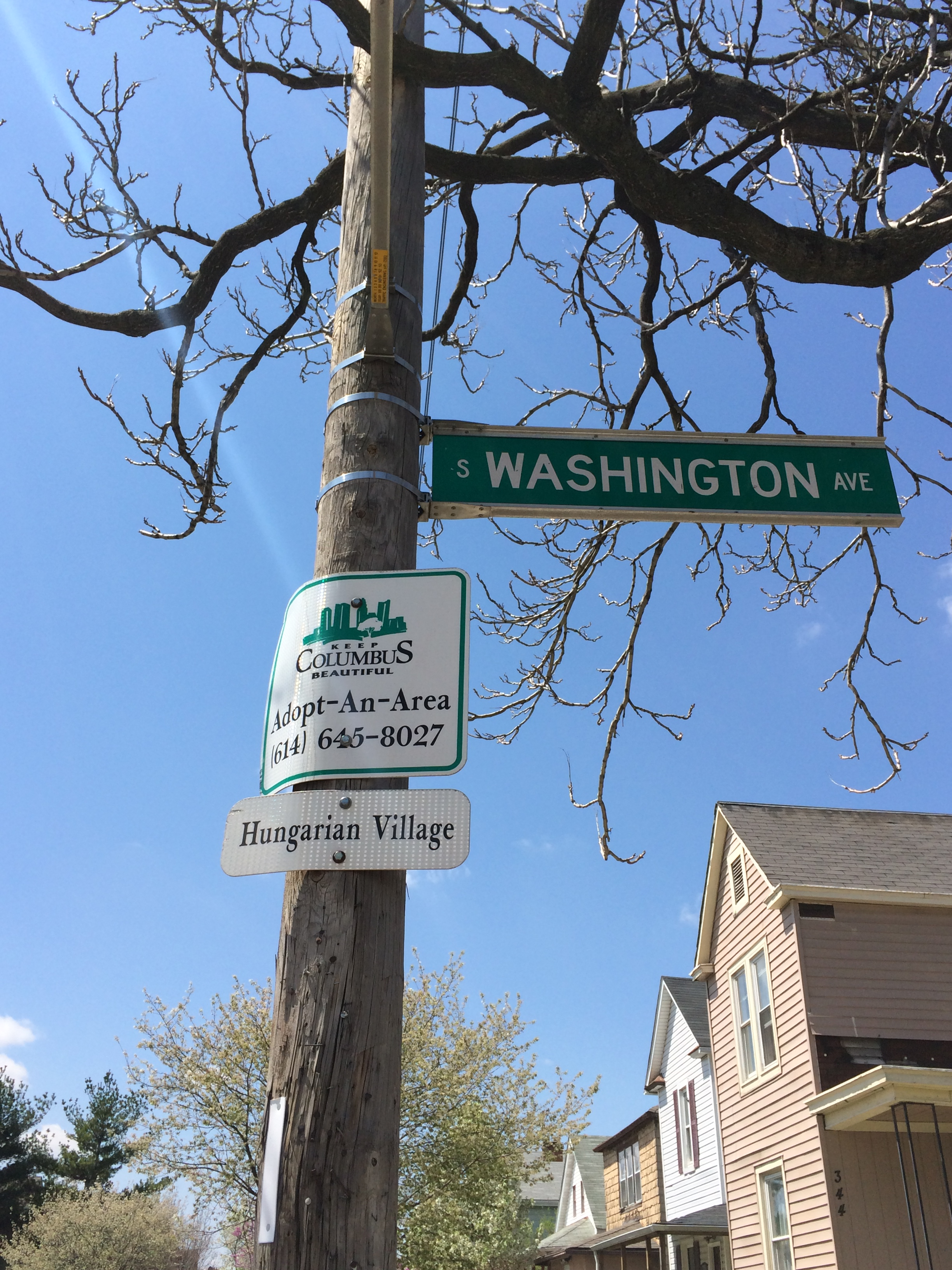
- Gateway sign for Hungarian Village
- Interactive map of Hungarian Village
- Coordinates: 39.92811°N 82.99014°W
- ZIP Code: 43207
- Area code: 614

Hungarian Village is located in Columbus, Ohio, south of downtown. It is located in Franklin County, within the boundaries of Parsons Avenue, South High Street, East Innis Avenue and Hinman Avenue.

== History ==
Hungarian Village is contained within the original boundaries of the Merion estate, established by Nathaniel Merion in 1809. The area is historically part of the Refugee Tract, which Congress granted as compensation to refugee soldiers from British Canada for their service in the American Revolutionary War. It was populated first by early British and Nova Scotian settlers and later by many German, Italian, and Irish immigrants during the construction boom of the early 1900s, when the area became known as "Steelton."

A Hungarian Reformed Church was established in 1913 and later rebuilt in 1923. Located at the intersection of East Woodrow Avenue and South Washington Avenue, the church is in the far south of the neighborhood. A corner stone on the face of the Hungarian Reformed church is inscribed with “United Magyar Protestant Church June 26, 1921.” This simple inscription links the church and its early Hungarian immigrant congregation to the Magyars of Hungary. In 1922 there were an estimated to be 1,200 Magyars living in Columbus.

Many Hungarian refugees immigrated to the area during the failed 1956 Hungarian Revolution, while many others settled in Cleveland, New Jersey, and New York. In 1973, Reverend Zoltan Szabo proposed the idea of defining the community as Hungarian Village, looking at the revitalization in nearby German Village as a model for a successful community. Twenty-five years after the Hungarian Revolution a plaque was erected, recognizing the Hungarians who died for human rights and freedom. This memorial stands outside of the Hungarian Reformed Church, which still houses the Hungarian Village Society today. In 1991, Hungarian President Árpád Göncz visited the village on a seven-day U.S. trip, stopping at the Hungarian Reformed Church.

== Geography ==
Hungarian Village is located approximately two miles south of the centre of downtown Columbus. Measuring four by seven city blocks, the neighborhood is located between the larger Merion Village, to the north, and Steelton, to the south.

== Structures and landmarks ==
Hungarian Reform Church

The Hungarian Reformed Church

The Hungarian Reformed Church is a staple in the Hungarian Village community and has served its purpose for over one hundred years. It is built out of red clay brick, much like many of the original homes in the area, and in a traditional Hungarian style. There are three cornerstones at the front approach of the church. The oldest reads "1906" while the other two give insight into the building's history. The most relevant stone reads "Sep 1913 Rebuilt Aug. 26 1923" and the final stone links the congregation back to its Magyar Hungarian population, reading "United Magayr Protestant Church June 26, 1923". The church still holds services every Sunday and serves as a meeting place for the Hungarian Village Society as well as other community events.

Southside Settlement Home Three blocks south of the Hungarian Reformed church sat the South Side Settlement (also known as St. Stephens South Side Community House) on the corner of Reeb and South Washington avenues. Though this settlement house is located in the neighboring Reeb-Hosack village, it played a big part in the success of all European immigrants coming into the Steelton area of Columbus. Established in 1899, this settlement house is one of the oldest in the Columbus area, and was designed to help the new European population (German, Italian, Hungarian, and Yugoslavian) find work in the steel mills, learn American culture and language, and ultimately gain citizenship there.

Entertainment A bowling alley and the Sachsen Helm Clubhouse were both located in Hungarian Village. The bowling alley, located on the corner of Woodrow Avenue and Parsons Avenue, is up the street from the church. The building still stands but remains mostly vacant; currently a small church congregation, True Deliverance Ministries, meets there. The Sachsen Helm Clubhouse location was on Woodrow Avenue between South 8th Street and Washington Avenue. The building still remains, but it is now occupied by the Columbus Association of the Deaf Incorporated. Its Germanic name gives insight to the fact that early on, Hungarian Village was home to many different European immigrants.

Bakery and Grocery At the corner of East Morrill Avenue and Parsons Avenue, a bakery attached to a store front used to occupy the building that is currently still on that site. A grocery store where over twelve languages were spoken and residents walked to is located at the edge of Hungarian Village, just down the street from the Hungarian Reformed Church in a concrete building. The grocery store is no longer there, but the building remains with a market now occupying that space.

== Residential ==
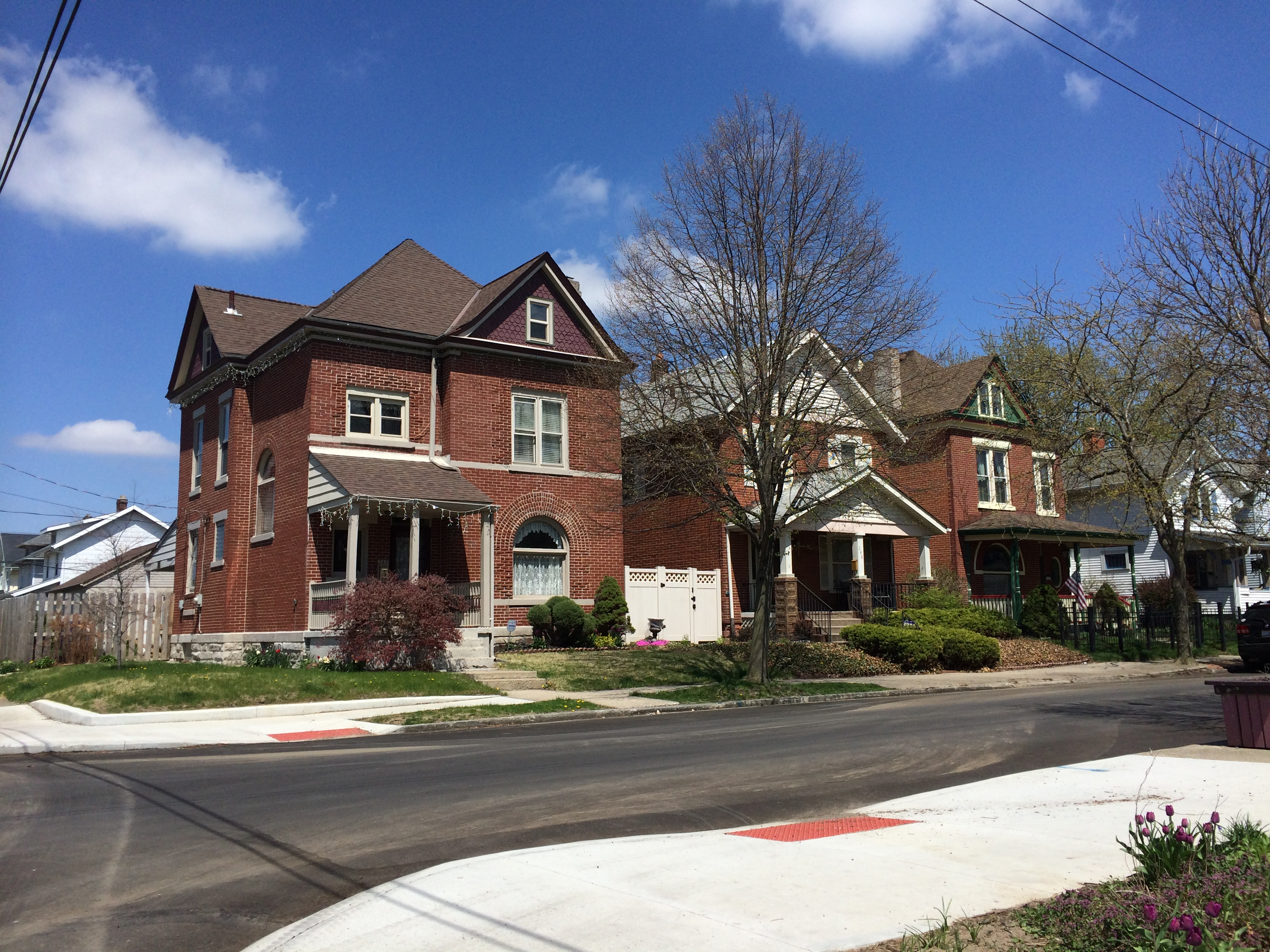
Dutch Colonial Style residences in Hungarian Village

Housing in this area is mixed between older homes that have been around since the original days of Old Hungarian Village and duplexes that have replaced historic homes after being purchased by landlords. Both the historic and the newer houses are generally single-family, two story frame structures that sit on narrow lots. Alleys border the backs of these lots upon what use to sit modest scale Queen Anne and Dutch Colonial style homes at a modest price.

In the 1950s and 1960s, Hungarian Village experienced a decline, however, not severe as other central city neighborhoods and this reversed by 1976.

== See also ==
- Nagy Brothers Shoe Repair
