= 1100 Superior =

Skyscraper in downtown Cleveland, Ohio

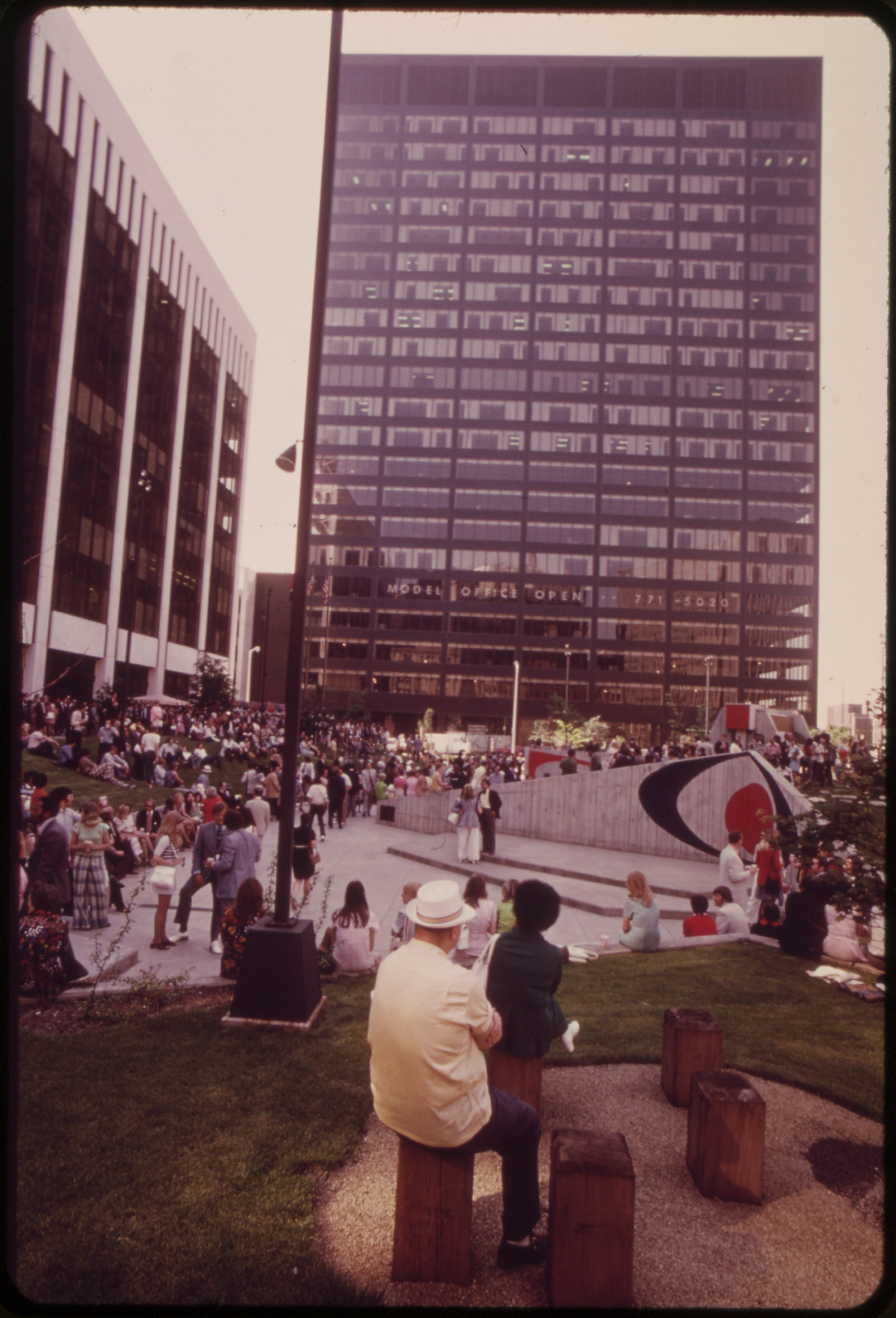
- The Diamond Shamrock Building (now 1100 Superior) rises behind Chester Commons (now Perk Park) in 1973

- Location within Ohio
- Former names: Diamond Shamrock; Diamond Building; Oswald Centre

General information
- Status: Completed
- Type: High-rise
- Architectural style: International
- Classification: Office
- Location: Nine-Twelve District, 1100 Superior Avenue, Cleveland, Ohio
- Coordinates: 41°30′10.15″N 81°41′11.17″W
- Construction started: 1971
- Completed: 1972
- Owner: LNR Partners

Height
- Architectural: 282 feet (86 m)
- Tip: 282 feet (86 m)
- Roof: 282 feet (86 m)

Technical details
- Floor count: 22
- Floor area: 27,677 square feet (2,571.3 m^{2})
- Grounds: 550,000 square feet (51,000 m^{2})

Design and construction
- Architecture firm: Skidmore, Owings & Merrill, LLP
- Structural engineer: Skidmore, Owings & Merrill, LLP
- Main contractor: Turner Construction

Other information
- Number of restaurants: 1
- Parking: Attached garage - 335 spaces

1100 Superior (formerly known as the Diamond Shamrock Building, the Diamond Building, and Oswald Centre) is a high rise in Downtown Cleveland, Ohio's emerging Nine-Twelve District, which is also home to One Cleveland Center, Ohio Savings Plaza, The 925 Building, PNC Center, and the former Eaton Center. It was built in 1972 for the important San Antonio, Texas firm of Diamond Shamrock which specialized in oil refining, it has 23 floors and rises to a height of 282 feet (86 m). It was designed by the firm of Skidmore, Owings and Merrill which also designed the nearby AECOM Building, and the Willis Tower in Chicago, Illinois. The firm was a leader in the modernist tower block design at the time of construction which believed in three principals: heavy metal anchoring, profuse windows for air and light, and simple muted dark colored facade paneling that gave their landmark buildings a "natural" organic look.

It is located at 1100 Superior Avenue along East 12th Street. In 1994, during a water main break, a four-story section of the Diamond Building lost some of its glass from pressure of the water. In 2012, the tower's naming rights were purchased by insurance brokerage the Oswald Cos. (which is written in bright red multistory letters on the north and south sides of the tower), one of its largest tenants. Oswald announced it would move to the former Ernst & Young Tower, now the Oswald Tower, in 2023.

== See also ==
- List of tallest buildings in Cleveland
