= U.S. Bank Centre (Cleveland) =

Coordinates: 41.5006°N 81.6820°W

US Bank Centre
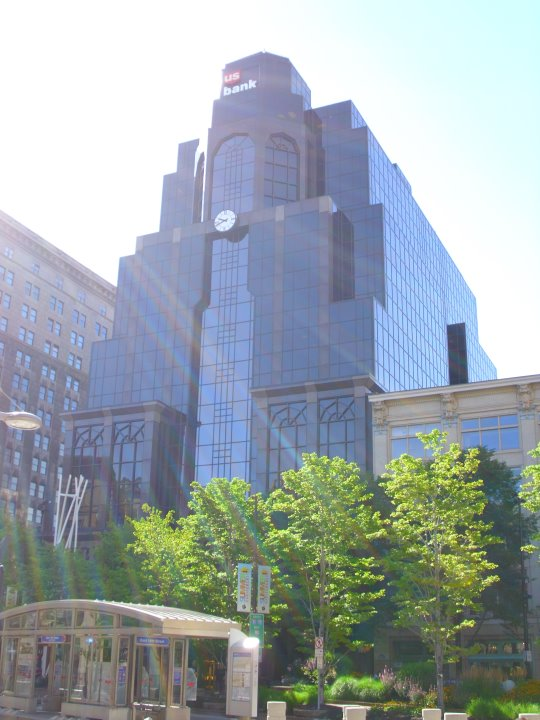
- Interactive map of the US Bank Centre area
- Former names: Renaissance Center

General information
- Type: Office
- Location: 1350 Euclid Avenue Cleveland, Ohio 44115 United States
- Construction started: 1990
- Completed: 1991

Height
- Roof: 64.08 m (210 ft)

Technical details
- Floor count: 16
- Floor area: 262,352 sq.ft.

Design and construction
- Architect: Richard L Bowen

The Cleveland US Bank Centre building is a high-rise located at 1350 Euclid Avenue in Cleveland, Ohio. Located in the heart of Cleveland's Theater District, the building was formerly known as Renaissance Center. It is the third tallest building in the district after the 1922-built 272 foot Keith Building and the 2020-built 396 foot apartment building, The Lumen.

The building has total available space of 80,578 square feet (7,485.9 m^{2}), with total space of 262,352 square feet. It was built in 1990 by Architect Richard L Bowen Associates. Other companies that played a part in the building are: Grubb & Ellis Management Services, Inc. - Cleveland Branch, Granicor Inc., Forest City Erectors, Inc., Heritage Development Company, Turner Construction Company, and Duke Construction. The building has an attached parking garage with 444 spaces, Conference Facilities, a Restaurant, and Class A amenities. The building has 15 Floors and totals 210 feet. The tower maintains a popular legend that those on floors 12-15 after midnight see odd figures that resemble Cleveland pioneers from the nearby municipal graveyard. These floors have become popular on local ghost hunts and area legends.

== Star Banc/Firstar/U.S. Bancorp ==
The outside building area was formerly known as Star Plaza, as it was a location of Cincinnati based Star Bank, which in turn changed its name to Milwaukee-based Firstar after that acquisition. Firstar later purchased Minneapolis-based U.S. Bank and kept the U.S. Bank name due to its more nationalized recognition.

Although this name swap is confusing, the resulting bank is, legally speaking, the former Cincinnati-founded bank. Thus, as Star already had several offices established in Ohio amongst numerous other states, the new company procured those properties. That merger explains U.S. Bancorp's presence in the Cleveland banking sector.

== See also ==
- Downtown Cleveland
- List of tallest buildings in Cleveland
