= Ernst & Young Tower =

Ernst & Young Tower may refer to:

- EY Tower, in Toronto, Canada
- Latitude (building), Sydney, formerly the Ernst & Young Tower
- Oswald Tower (building) in Cleveland, Ohio, formerly the Ernst & Young Tower
