= Superior Building =

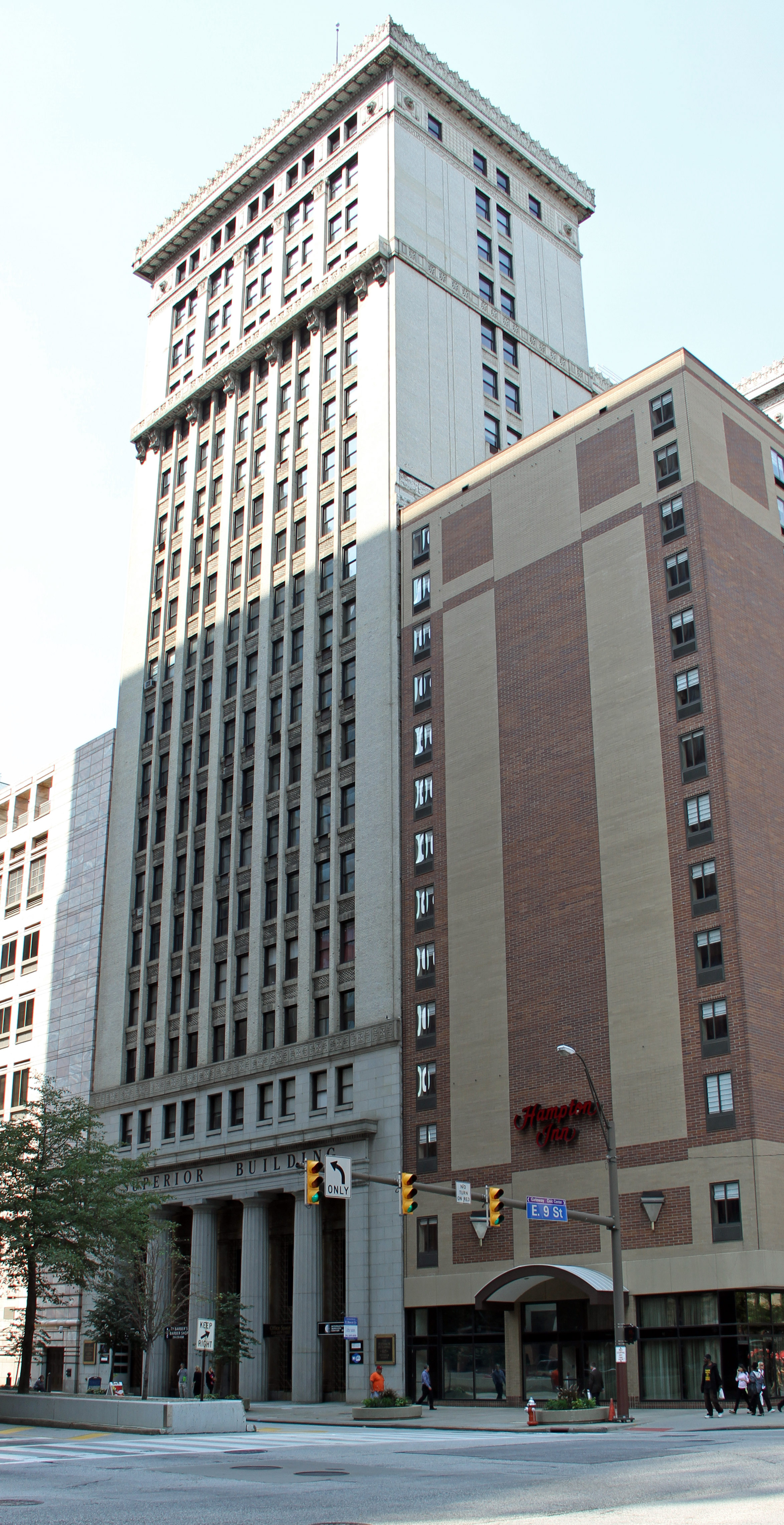
- Interactive map of the Superior Building area

General information
- Status: Completed
- Type: Office
- Location: 815 Superior Avenue, Cleveland, Ohio United States
- Opening: 1922

Height
- Roof: 265 ft (81 m)

Technical details
- Floor count: 22

Design and construction
- Architect: Walker & Weeks
- Developer: E. V. Bishoff Company
- Cleveland Discount Building
- U.S. National Register of Historic Places
- Location within Cleveland Location within Ohio Location within the United States
- Location: Cleveland, Ohio
- Coordinates: 41°30′8.5″N 81°41′22″W
- Built: 1920
- Architect: Walker & Weeks; Curtis, Craig, Co.
- Architectural style: Classical Revival
- NRHP reference No.: 91001416
- Added to NRHP: October 2, 1991

The Superior Building, originally known as the Cleveland Discount Building, is a high-rise building in Cleveland, Ohio. The building rises 265 feet (81 m) in Downtown Cleveland. It contains 22 floors, and was completed in 1922. The architectural firm who designed the building was Walker & Weeks. The building's design incorporates a set of Doric columns in its base.

The Superior Building was one of the earliest skyscrapers to be completed in Cleveland. However, it never stood as the tallest structure in the city; the Keith Building, also completed in 1922, rose only 7 feet (2.1 m) taller, and thus captured the title of tallest building in Cleveland. The Superior Building was added to the National Register of Historic Places in 1991.

== See also ==
- List of tallest buildings in Cleveland
- Society for Savings Building
