= The Chesterfield Building =

Coordinates: 41°30′07.1″N 81°41′03.9″W

The Sphere
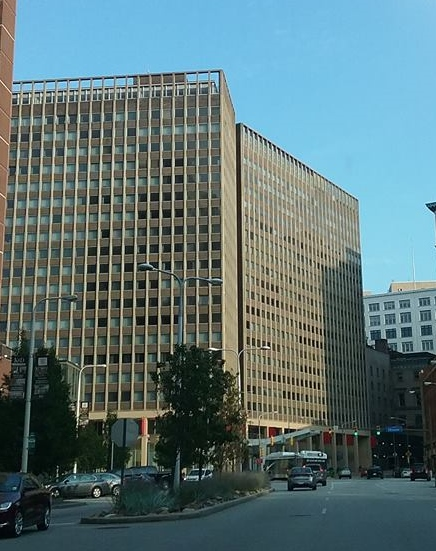
- Former names: The Chesterfield

General information
- Type: Residential
- Location: 1801 East 12th Street Cleveland, Ohio 44114 United States
- Construction started: 1965
- Completed: 1967

Height
- Roof: 60.96 m (200 ft)

Technical details
- Floor count: 20

Design and construction
- Architect: Charles Luckman Associates

The Chesterfield Building is a 1965-erected high-rise 200-foot-tall, 20-story apartment building complex located in the Reserve Square area of downtown Cleveland. The building was designed by Charles Luckman who is responsible for the Aon Center (Los Angeles), the Los Angeles Convention Center, the Madison Square Garden in New York and the AmTrust Financial Center in Cleveland among many others. The complex contains 407 living units and features distinctive windows that open out giving the impression that the building is an old factory, but the building has always been apartments. The Chesterfield features a rooftop swimming pool and underwent major cosmetic (exterior) renovation in 2001.

In 2011, building management were alerted of their having 78 code violations, including structural issues, plumbing problems, foundation fissures, and lack of pest control. The building was also rebranded as The Sphere and renovated in 2015. In 2019 the building was renamed The Luckman. Currently the building is branded as LIV Cleveland since 2025.

== See also ==
- List of tallest buildings in Cleveland
- Charles Luckman
