= The Lumen =

Skyscraper in Cleveland, Ohio

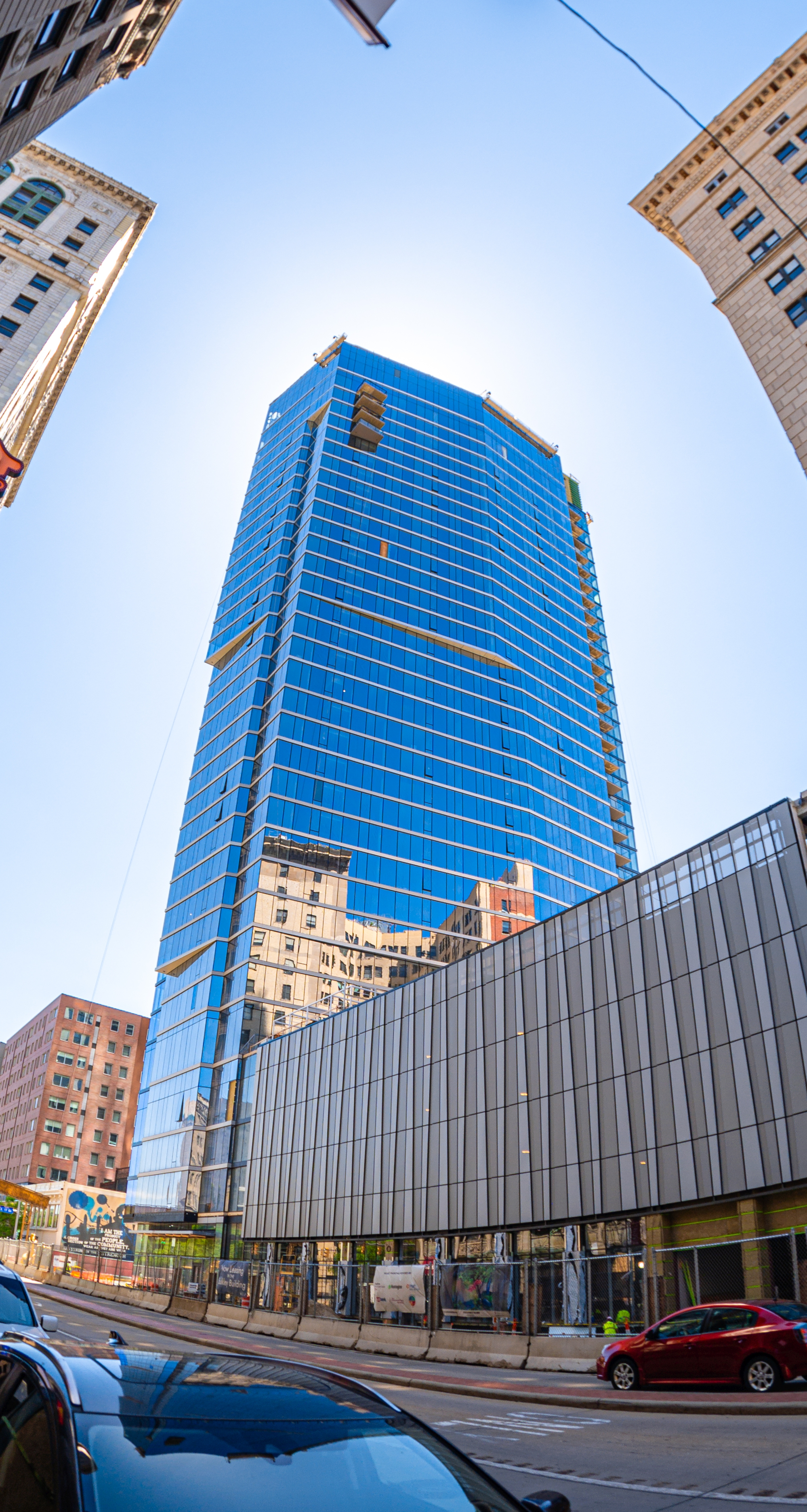
- The Lumen in 2020
- Interactive map of the The Lumen area

General information
- Type: Residential
- Architectural style: Contemporary
- Location: 1600 Euclid Avenue; Cleveland, Ohio
- Coordinates: 41°30′2.99″N 81°40′48.97″W
- Construction started: 2018
- Completed: 2020
- Cost: $135 million
- Owner: Playhouse Square Foundation

Height
- Antenna spire: 120.70m/396 ft
- Roof: 337
- Top floor: 35

Technical details
- Floor count: 35
- Floor area: 387,885 m² / 4,175,159 ft²
- Lifts/elevators: 3

Design and construction
- Architect: Solomon Cordwell Buenz
- Developer: Hines
- Engineer: Donley for Gilbane Building Company

Other information
- Number of units: 318

The Lumen is a high-rise apartment building in the Playhouse Square district of downtown Cleveland, Ohio. Completed in 2020, the 34-story, 396-foot (121 m) tower sits at the southwest corner of Euclid Avenue and East 17th Street, adjacent to the Hanna Building and across Euclid from the Keith Building. It is the second new apartment building built in downtown Cleveland since the 1970s, following the construction of The Beacon in 2019.

== Site ==
Formerly a large surface parking lot located across from the Playhouse Square theaters, The Lumen is the fruition of a long-held vision of Playhouse Square and its former president and CEO, Art Falco, to turn the district into a viable residential community. Playhouse Square hired development manager Hines, builder Providence, Rhode Island–based Gilbane and international architectural firm Chicago-based Solomon Cordwell Buenz to complete the project. In late 2018, the Cuyahoga County Council approved a $10 million loan to Playhouse Square for the construction of the tower, which is estimated at $135 million. The floor plan includes 318 apartment units, 550 parking spaces, and 22,000 square feet (2,000 m^{2}) of common space for residents, making it one of the largest apartment complexes in the city center. During excavation, crews discovered remnants of old foundations from other underground projects.

== See also ==
- List of tallest buildings in Cleveland
