= One University Circle =

Building in Cleveland, Ohio, USA

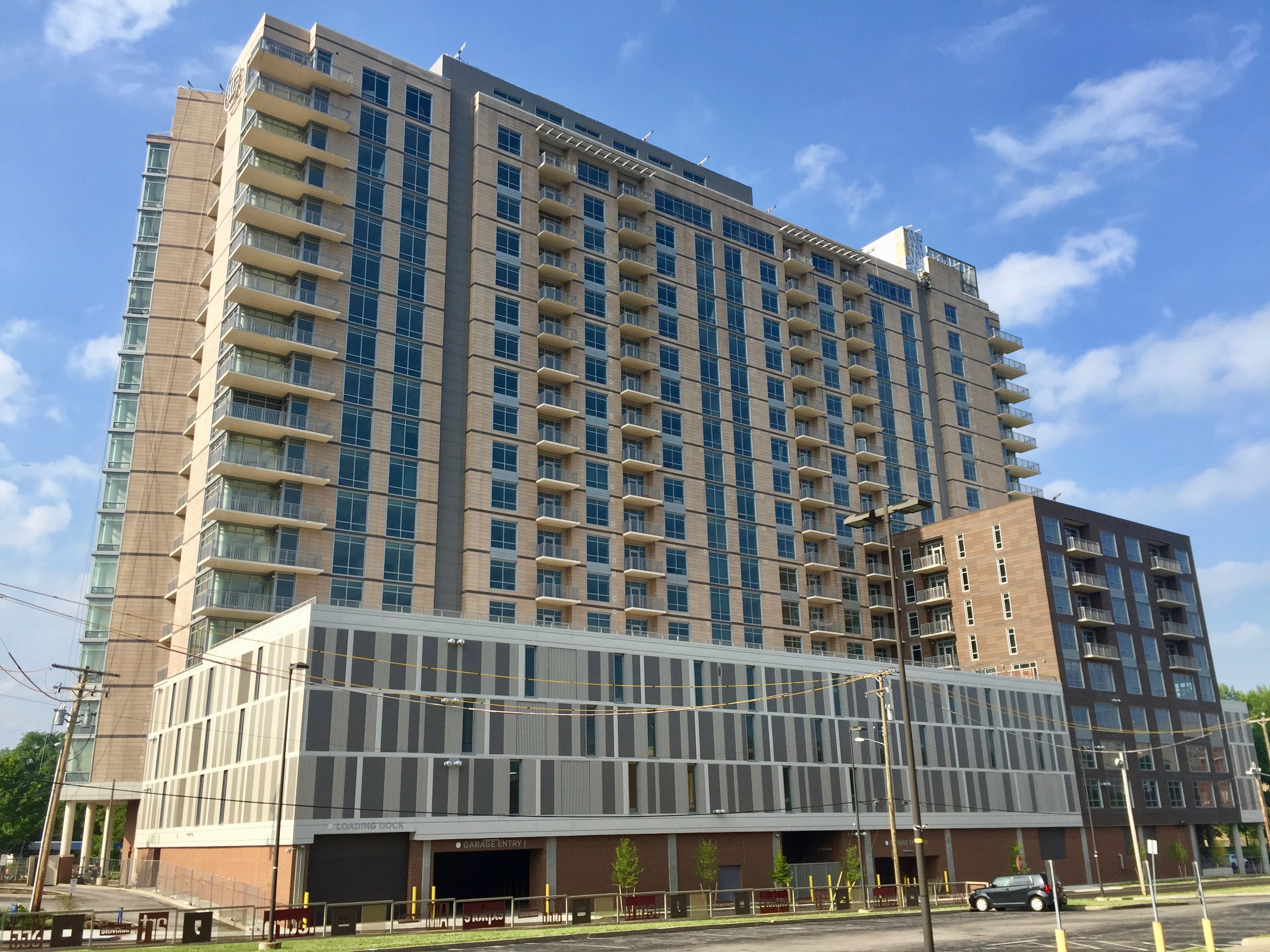
- One University Circle
- Interactive map of the One University Circle area

General information
- Status: Completed
- Type: Residential, office, mixed-use
- Location: University Circle, Cleveland, Ohio 44106 United States
- Coordinates: 41.503°N 81.612°W
- Construction started: 2016
- Completed: 2018

Height
- Roof: 235 ft (72 m)

Technical details
- Floor count: 20

Design and construction
- Developer: First Interstate Properties, Ltd. Petros Development Corp.

Website
- oneuniversitycircle.com

One University Circle is a mixed-used high rise in the University Circle district of Cleveland. It is located just down the block from the Cleveland Clinic as well as Case Western Reserve University on Euclid Avenue. Being constructed on the former location of the Children's Museum of Cleveland, the project is the first high-rise apartment building completed in the city in over 40 years. It houses 280 apartments, including penthouse apartments, a parking garage, concierge services, a fitness center, an outdoor swimming pool and a sky lounge offering bird's-eye views of the city.

== See also ==
- List of tallest buildings in Cleveland
