= The Beacon (Cleveland) =

Skyscraper in Cleveland, Ohio

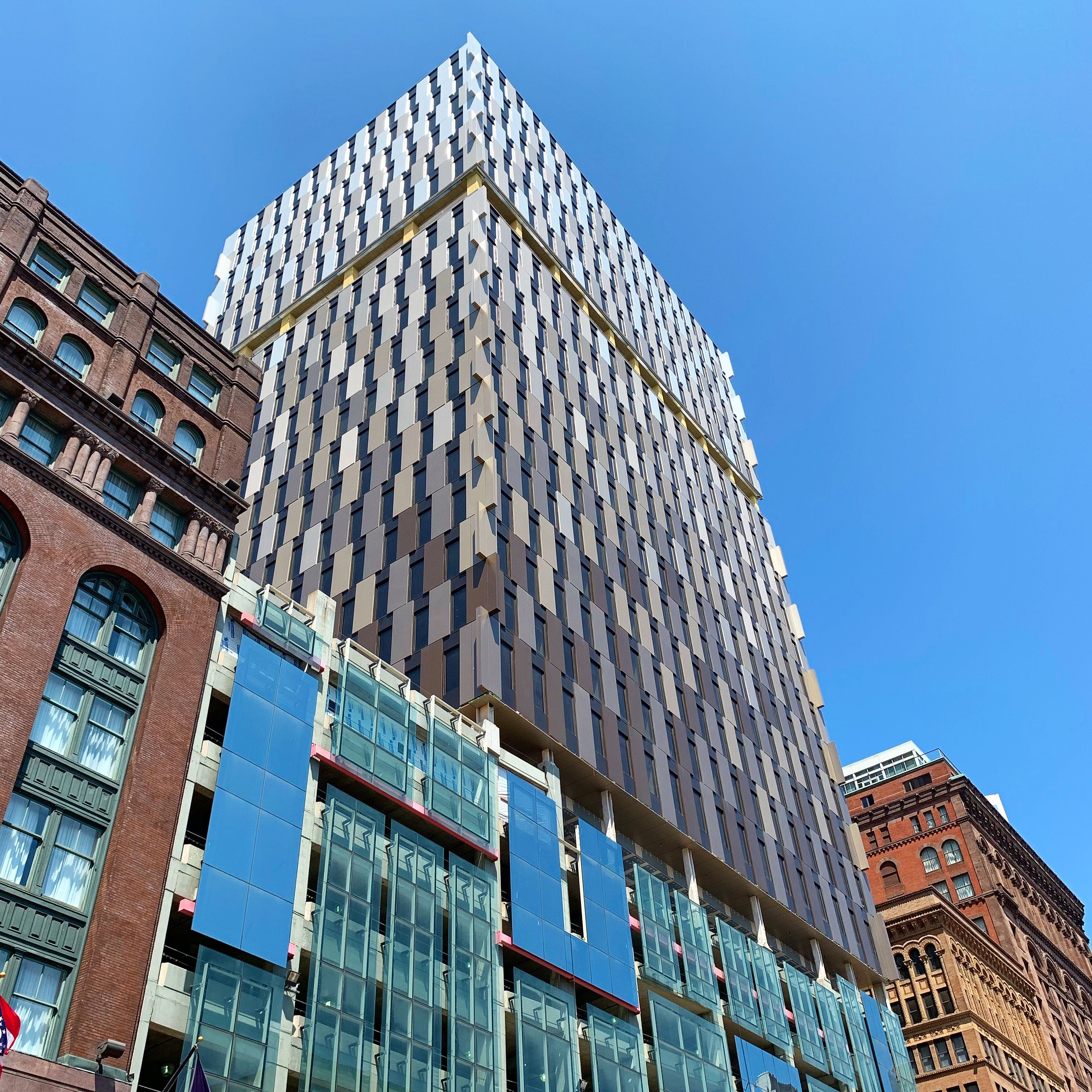
- The Beacon in 2019
- Interactive map of the The Beacon area

General information
- Status: Completed
- Type: Residential
- Location: 515 Euclid Avenue Cleveland, Ohio, United States
- Coordinates: 41.500262°N 81.689845°W
- Construction started: 2017
- Completed: November 6, 2019
- Cost: $95 million

Height
- Roof: 350 feet

Technical details
- Floor count: 29

Design and construction
- Architects: Westlake Reed Leskosky, Nadaaa and Vocon
- Developer: Stark Enterprises

Website
- www.thebeaconcleveland.com

The Beacon is a residential skyscraper in downtown Cleveland that began construction at 515 Euclid Avenue in late 2017 and was completed in late 2019. The tower rises 350 feet (110 m) tall, with approval from the city council to exceed the city's 250 feet (76 m) limit. The Beacon sits at 29 floors; 8 floors of parking garage, 19 floors of one- and two-bedroom residential suites and rooftop lounge.

== Development and design ==
Part of the need for the tower was due to a resurgence of interest in downtown Cleveland, spearheaded by a 77% increase of new housing units and 95% occupancy rate from 2000 to 2015. It is the fourth-tallest residential building in the city behind the Terminal Tower, which was converted into a mixed-use residential building in 2019, The Lumen, and The 9 Cleveland.

The chosen site, on the lot behind 200 Public Square on East Roadway and Euclid, had been the location of an earlier proposed apartment tower. For various reasons, mostly due to financing and design flaws, an eight-story parking garage was erected but the tower never rose. The winning design presented to the Cleveland City Council was by Cleveland architecture firm of Westlake Reed Leskosky and the Boston firm NADAA.

The Beacon is the first new residential high rise erected in Cleveland's central business district since 1974. The Beacon features a façade interlocked with colored interchanging metal panels that reflects the sun.

== See also ==
- List of tallest buildings in Cleveland
