= Frank J. Lausche State Office Building =

Coordinates: 41°29′51″N 81°41′50″W

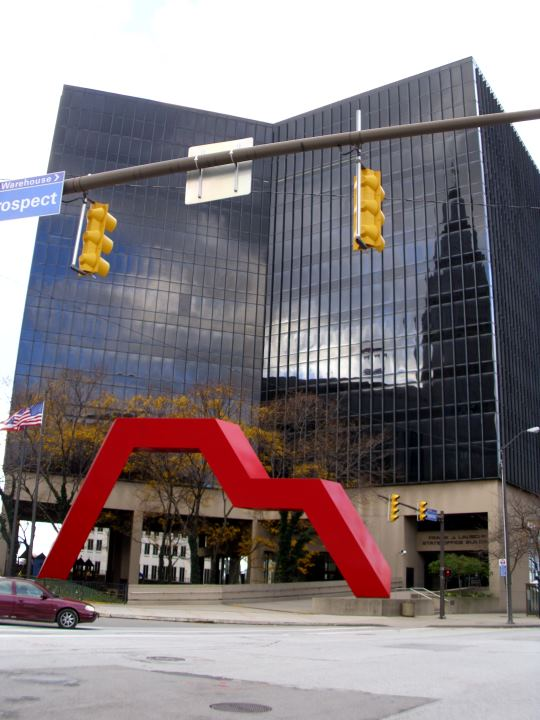
- The Last by Tony Smith in front of the Lausche
- Interactive map of the Frank J. Lausche State Office Building area
- Former names: Lausche Building

General information
- Type: Governmental
- Location: 615 West Superior Avenue Cleveland, Ohio 44113 United States
- Construction started: 1977
- Completed: 1979

Height
- Roof: 62.17 m (204 ft)

Technical details
- Floor count: 15
- Floor area: 458,000 sq. ft.

Design and construction
- Architect: Toguchi Madison

The Frank J. Lausche State Office Building is a 1979-erected 204-foot-tall, 15-story high-rise in downtown Cleveland on the corner of West Superior and Prospect Avenue on the city's Tower City Center complex. It sits in front of the 2002-built Carl B. Stokes United States Courthouse. The building's majority of tenants (over 1300) work for the State of Ohio. The structure cost the state US$26 million to build in 1977–1979 (about $128 million now). In front of the building sits sculptor Tony Smith's Last.

The uniquely shaped structure is seven-sided, which closely resembles the dimensions of the land it is built on. No more land was allotted to the project because the Greater Cleveland Regional Transit Authority owned the air rights. The building was designed architect Robert P. Madison.

== Name ==
The Lausche is named after Frank Lausche, the 47th mayor of the city of Cleveland, who served from 1942 to 1945 He then became the 57th governor of the state of Ohio and served in that capacity from 1945 to 1947 and 1949 to 1957, having lost in between the 1947-1949 term. Following this he served as a United States senator from 1957 to 1969.

== See also ==
- List of tallest buildings in Cleveland
- List of mayors of Cleveland
