= Parkview Apartments (Cleveland) =

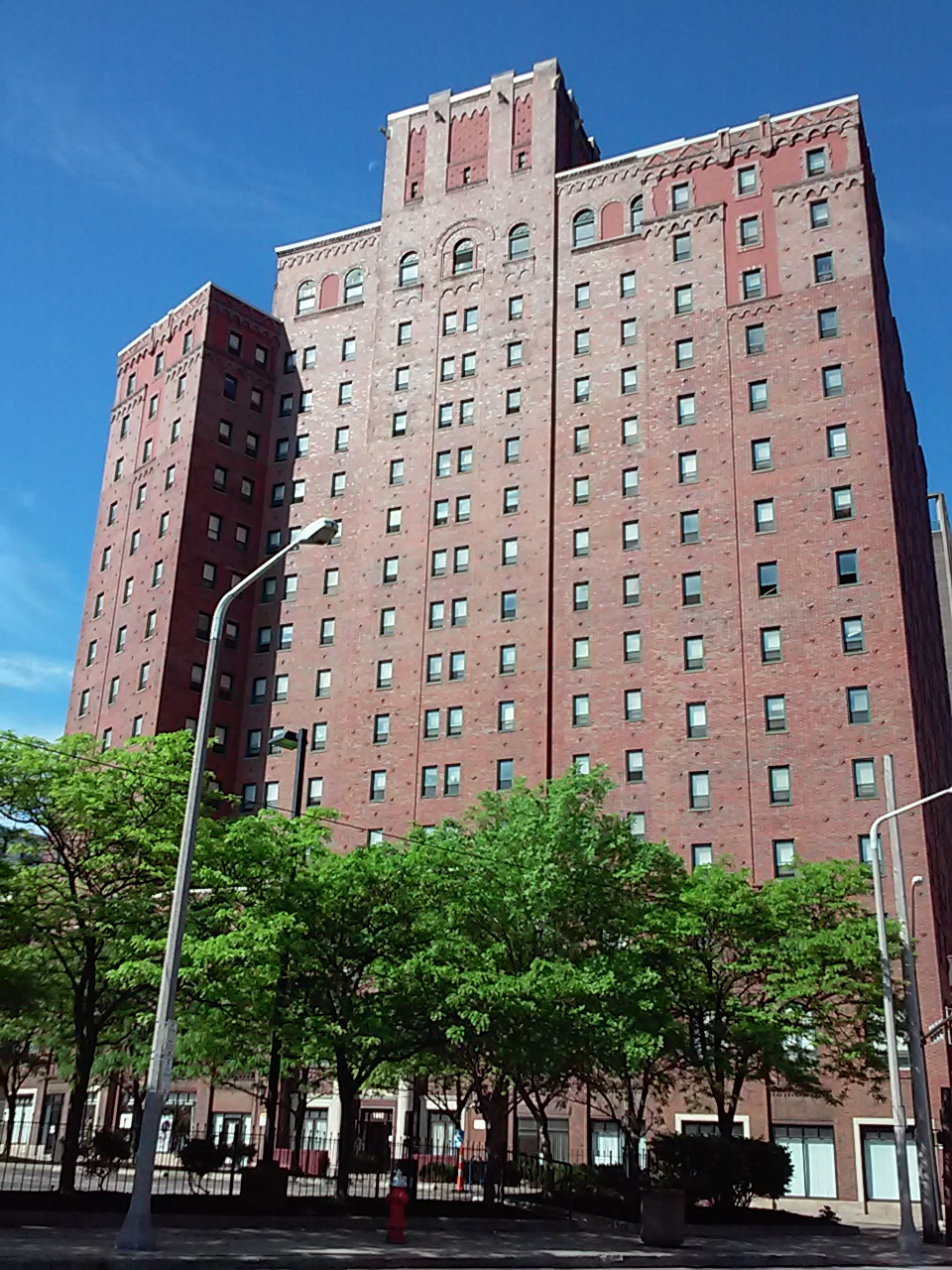
- The former Allerton Cleveland

- Location within Cleveland
- Former names: Allerton Hotel, The Manger Hotel, Gaslight Inn

General information
- Type: Residential
- Location: 1802 East 13th Street Cleveland, Ohio 44114 United States
- Coordinates: 41.5026°N 81.6835°W
- Construction started: 1925
- Completed: 1926

Height
- Roof: 64.92 m (213 ft)

Technical details
- Floor count: 18

Design and construction
- Architects: Murgatroyd & Ogden

The Parkview Apartments is a 1926-built 213 foot former Allerton Hotel high-rise that was converted into apartments in downtown Cleveland's Nine-Twelve District that sits just south of the Reserve Square complex. The building is in the Renaissance revival style and is facaded in detailed red brick. Erected in the 1920s the building demonstrates elaborate decorational motifs and castle-like design that evokes regal elegance throughout the structure. The Parkview also features a tower or spire at its apex.

It sits at an awkward angle in relation to the street grid as the main avenue, Chester, runs at a similar angle towards East 30th Street. The building is located just north of another famous former hotel into apartment conversion, the Statler. It is one of four major hotels built in the 1910s and 1920s to pay homage to that era of construction in Cleveland, others being the Statler, the Winton Manor, and the Renaissance Cleveland Hotel, all have been re purposed except the Hotel Cleveland which is a hotel till the present day.

== The Allerton ==
The Cleveland Allerton greatly echoes the style of the Allerton in Chicago though that building stands over 120 feet (37 m) taller. The Allerton company at one time owned hotels in New York City and Detroit as well. The Allerton featured a swimming pool, rooftop patio, large coffee shop and several recreational features. The Cleveland property closed as a hotel in 1971 and today it is low income housing. That is a far cry from its bombastic high-end regal splendor afforded the guests when it hosted the upper crust of society in the 1920s and 1930s. Regardless, the historic residential property is gratefully being utilized and has survived largely intact for generations to come.

== See also ==
- List of tallest buildings in Cleveland, Ohio
