= Standard Building (Cleveland) =

Office building in Cleveland, Ohio

Coordinates: 41°30′2.98″N 81°41′43.47″W

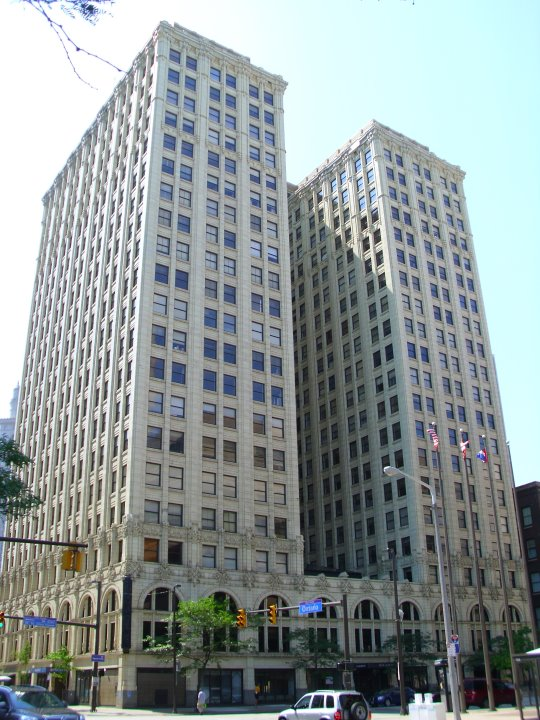
- Interactive map of the Standard Building area
- Former names: Brotherhood of Locomotive Engineers' Bank Building, Engineers' Bank Building, Standard Bank Building

General information
- Type: Office
- Location: 1370 Ontario Street Cleveland, Ohio 44113 United States
- Construction started: 1923
- Completed: 1925
- Owner: Weston, Inc.

Height
- Roof: 85.96 m (282 ft)

Technical details
- Floor count: 21

Design and construction
- Architect: Knox & Elliott

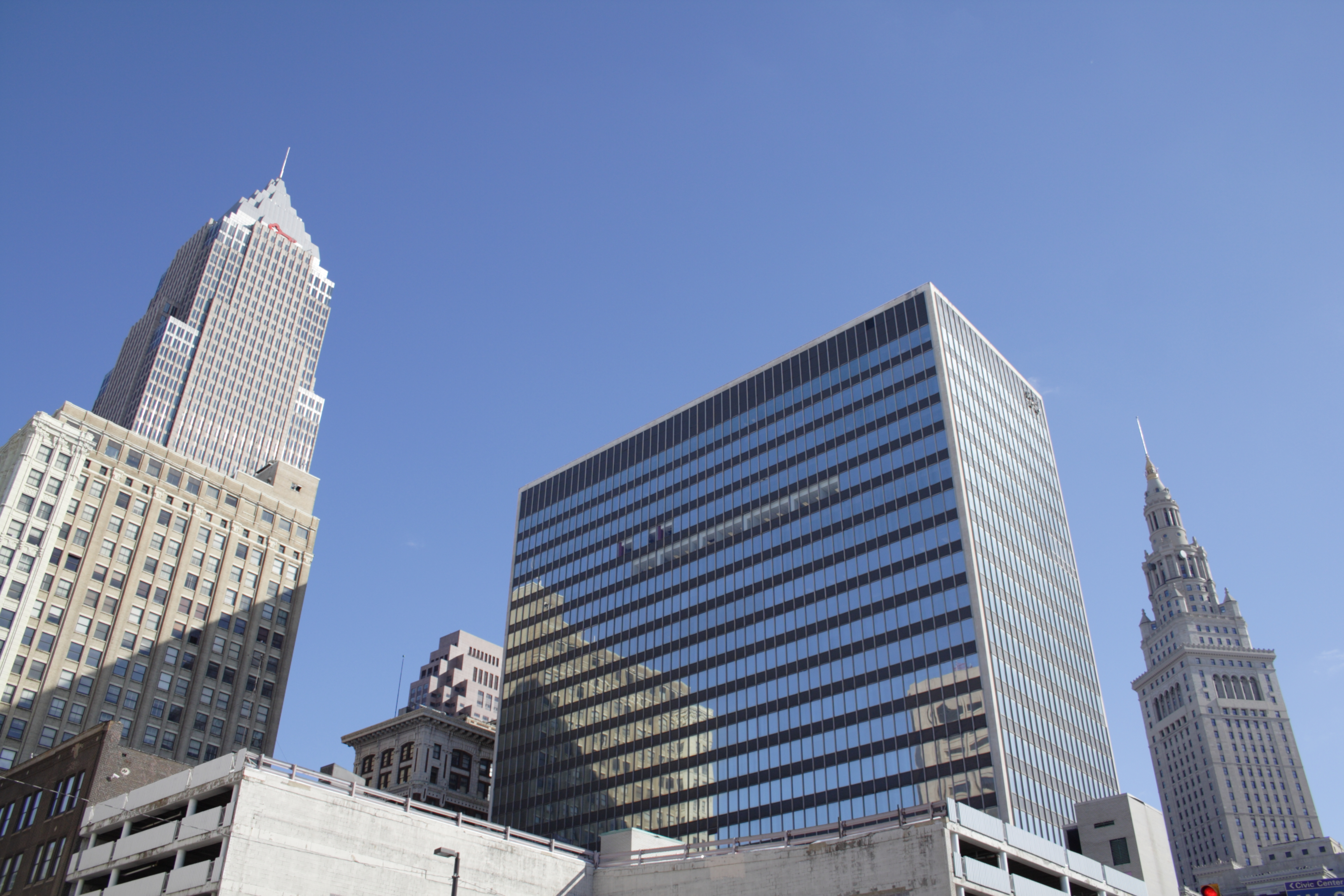
Buildings in Downtown Cleveland, as seen from the intersection of West 3rd Street and St. Clair Avenue

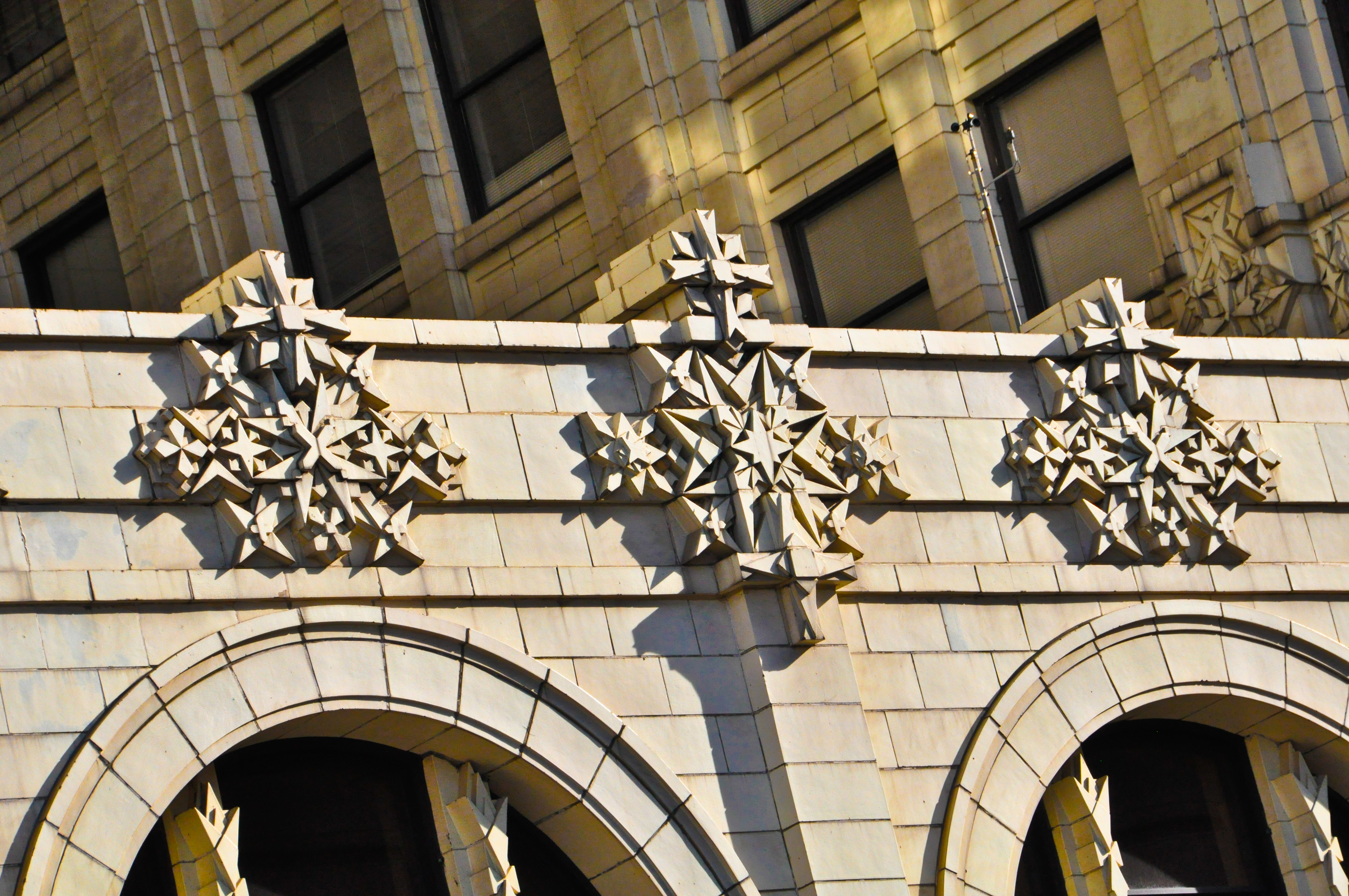
Building detail facing St. Clair Avenue

The Standard Building, (originally the Brotherhood of Locomotive Engineers Cooperative National Bank Building and later the Standard Bank Building), is a high-rise apartment building located at the southwest corner of Ontario Street and St. Clair Avenue in downtown Cleveland, Ohio. Rising to a height of 282 feet (86 meters), the Standard Building was the second tallest building in Cleveland when it was completed in 1925. Its north and east facades are clad in cream-colored terra cotta with a recurring starburst motif. The south face, which can be seen from Public Square, is unadorned and windowless. It was designed by Knox and Elliot architects, and was built for $7 million. It was built by the Brotherhood of Locomotive Engineers and Trainmen who owned the building until 2014, when it was sold to Weston, Inc.

== History ==
During the Great Depression, Standard Bank ran into financial difficulties and was sold by the BLE. It merged with two other Cleveland banks in 1930, forming Standard Trust Bank. This bank subsequently failed in 1931 and its assets were liquidated. From World War II until July, 1967, the bank lobby served as an induction station (after 1965, known as an Armed Forces Examining and Entrance Station) for the U.S. military. In the 1940s the building housed Cleveland College, a downtown campus of Western Reserve University, and was the last building of that campus.

To the east, across Ontario Street, is the Marriott at Key Center, built on the site of the landmark Engineers Building, which the BLE sold in 1988 for development, moving into the Standard Building. To the north, across St. Clair Avenue, is the Cuyahoga County Justice Center. The Old Stone Church abuts its south side.

Currently it is the 21st highest building in Cleveland. It was designated a Cleveland Landmark in 1979. In 2007, the boundary of the Euclid Avenue Historic District was increased to include the building, among other structures. In 2014, it was purchased by Weston, Inc. for $3.9 million, and was converted into an apartment building.

== See also ==
- List of tallest buildings in Cleveland
