= List of tallest buildings in Cleveland =

Skyline of Cleveland
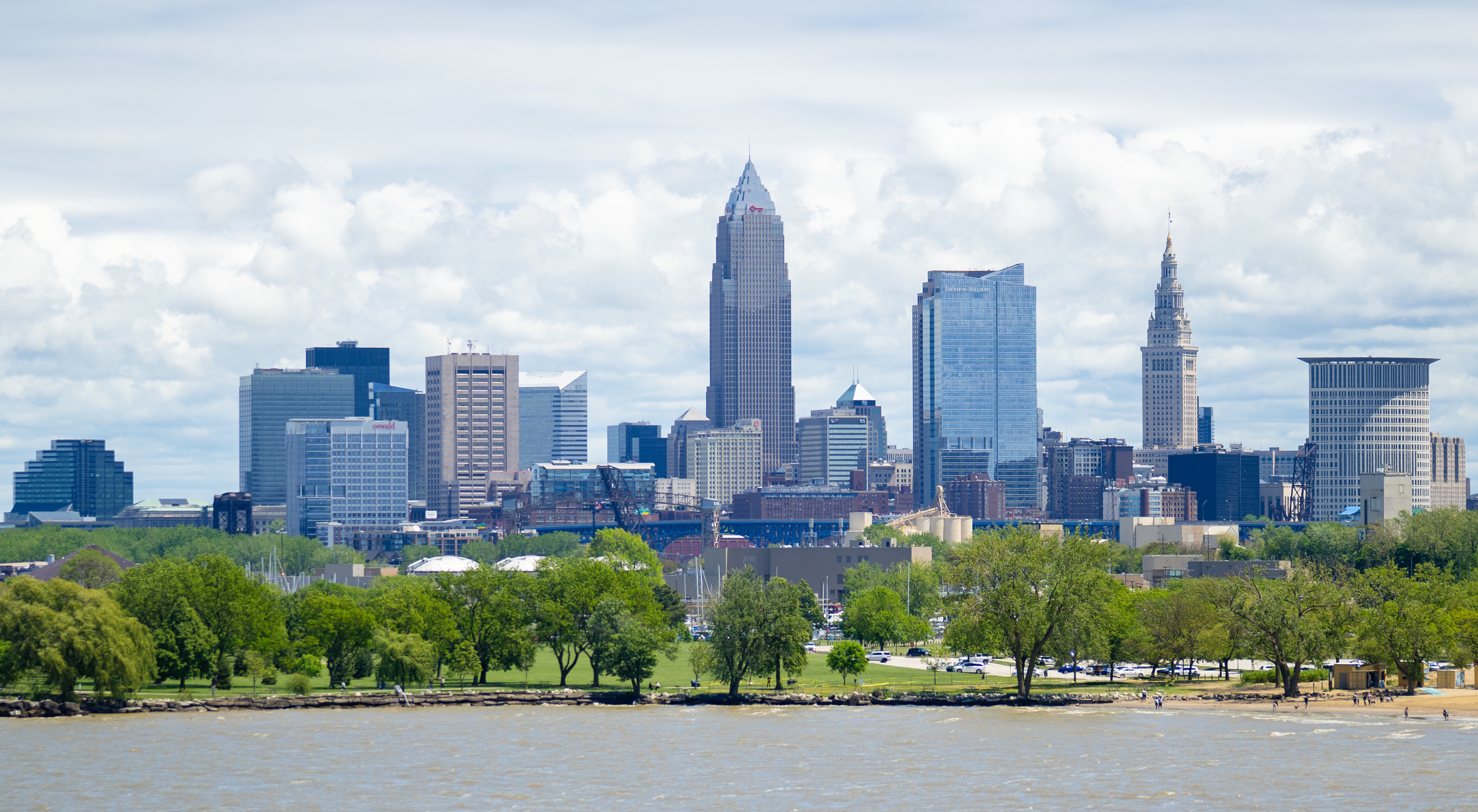
- Downtown Cleveland from Edgewater Park in 2025
- Tallest building: Key Tower (1991)
- Tallest building height: 947 ft (288.7 m)
- First 150 m+ building: Terminal Tower (1927)

Number of tall buildings (2026)
- Taller than 100 m (328 ft): 19
- Taller than 150 m (492 ft): 5
- Taller than 200 m (656 ft): 3

Number of tall buildings — feet
- Taller than 200 ft (61.0 m): 51
- Taller than 300 ft (91.4 m): 21

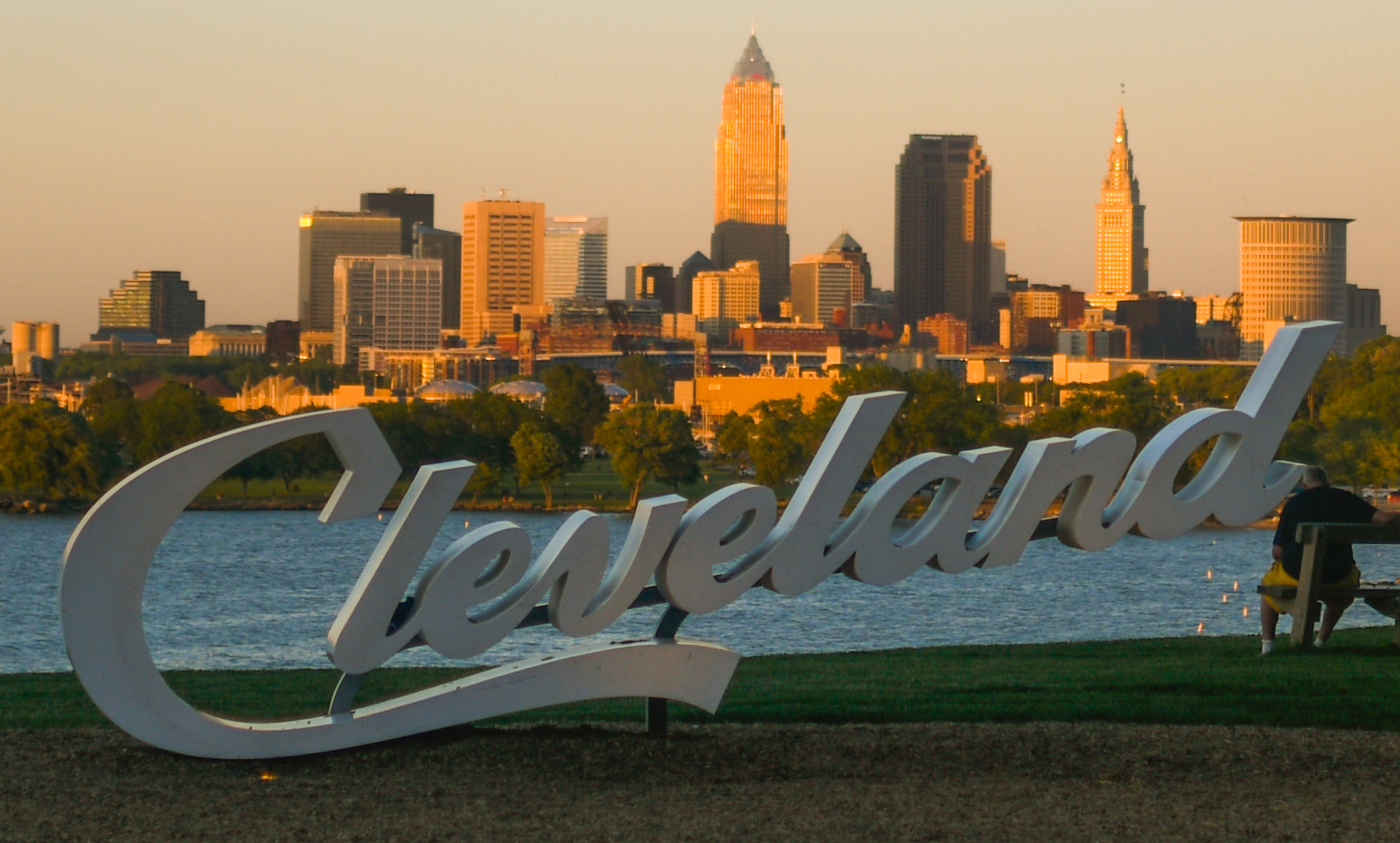
Cleveland's skyline behind the Cleveland Script Sign in Edgewater Park

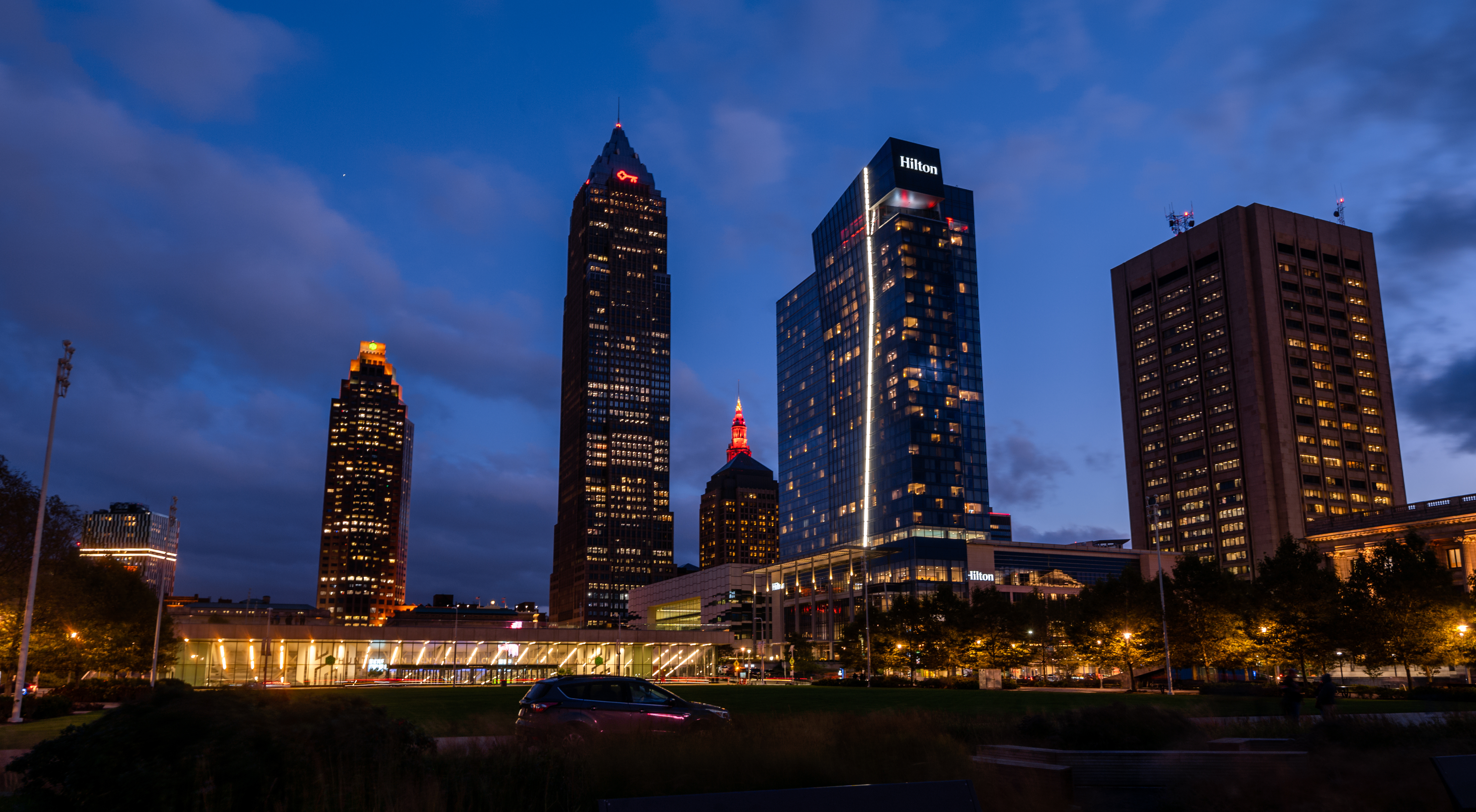
Skyscrapers surrounding Civic Center at night

Cleveland, the second most populous city in the U.S. state of Ohio, is home to 51 completed high-rises taller than 200 feet (61 m), 21 of which have a height greater than 300 feet (91 m). By both metrics, Cleveland has the largest skyline in Ohio, ahead of Columbus and Cincinnati. The tallest building in Cleveland is the 57-story Key Tower, which rises 947 feet (289 m) on Public Square. The tower has been the tallest building in Ohio since its completion in 1991 and the tallest in the Midwestern United States outside of Chicago. The Terminal Tower, 771 feet (235 m), is the second tallest building in Cleveland and Ohio. At the time of its completion in 1927, the building was the tallest in the world outside New York City.

The history of skyscrapers in Cleveland began in 1889 with the construction of the Society for Savings Building, often called the city's first skyscraper. One of the largest cities in the United States in the first half of the 20th century, Cleveland went through an early building boom in the 1920s, during which several high-rises, most notably the Ohio Bell Building and the Terminal Tower, were constructed. The centerpiece of the Cleveland Union Terminal rail station, the Terminal Tower was more than twice the height of any other building in the city. It dominated Cleveland's skyline for decades, as high-rise development ceased in the wake of the Great Depression until the late 1950s.

The city experienced a second, larger building boom downtown from the late 1960s to the early 1990s, even as deindustrialization caused the city's population to decline. Significant additions include the International-style Erieview Tower in 1964, the prism-shaped One Cleveland Center in 1983, and 200 Public Square in 1984, built as the headquarters for Standard Oil of Ohio. The boom culminated in the construction of the Key Tower, which surpassed the Terminal Tower as the city's tallest building in 1991. During the 1990s and 2000s, Cleveland saw few skyscraper construction projects, a notable exception being the Carl B. Stokes United States Courthouse. More high-rises were built from the 2010s onwards as a result of revitalization efforts downtown, including the Hilton Cleveland Downtown Hotel and residential towers such as The Lumen and Beacon. The 616 ft (188 m) Sherwin-Williams Headquarters, the city's tallest building in three decades, was completed in 2025 as the headquarters of the eponymous paint and coating company.

The large majority of tall buildings in Cleveland are located in Downtown Cleveland, which sits on the southern shore of Lake Erie and lies northeast of the Cuyahoga River. Additionally, the city's skyline is mostly surrounded by Ohio State Route 2 and Interstate 90. Cleveland's skyline is the largest on Lake Erie and one of the largest on the American half of the Great Lakes. The University Circle neighborhood, at about 4.3 miles (6.9 km) east of downtown, contains a small number of high-rises. The area has seen a period of recent growth, with its two tallest buildings, Artisan and One University Circle, completed after 2015.

== History ==
Number of buildings by height in Cleveland by the end of each year, based on the list below. Click on the legend to toggle a specific height on or off. View chart definition.

== Cityscape ==
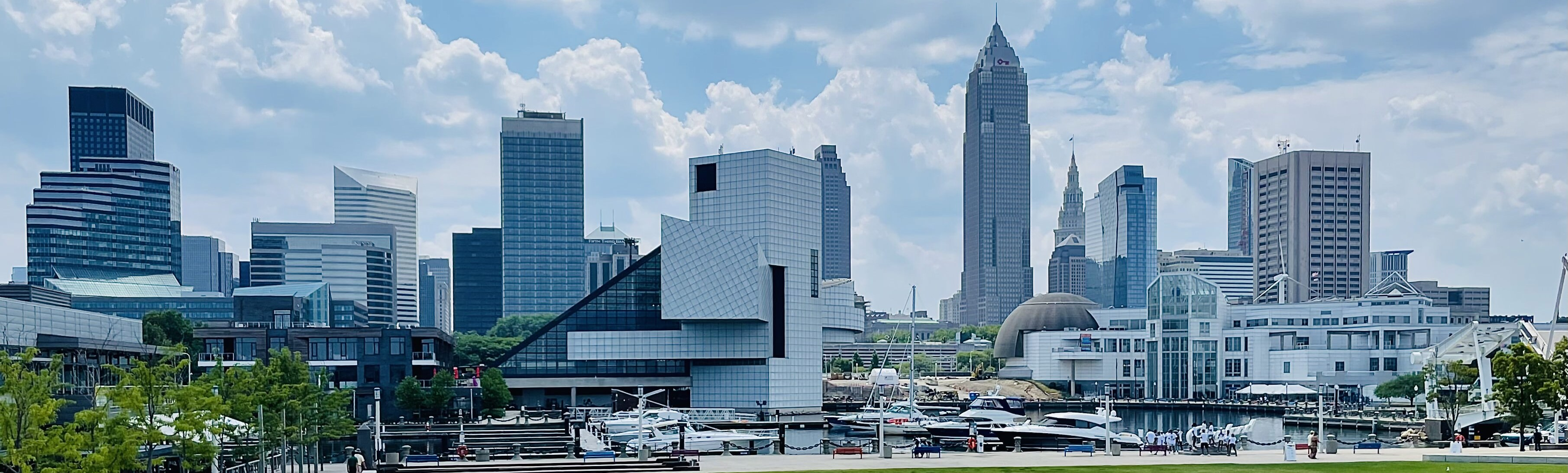
Cleveland from Voinovich Bicentennial Park in 2024 (Click or hover over image to identify buildings)

== Map of tallest buildings ==
The map below show the location of buildings taller than 200 ft (61 m) in Downtown Cleveland, where the majority of such buildings are. Each marker is numbered by the building's height rank, and colored by the decade of its completion.

Buildings taller than 200 ft (61 m) in Cleveland. An asterisk (*) next to the building's name indicates it is located outside the map.
- 1950s and before
- 1960s
- 1970s
- 1980s
- 1990s
- 2000s
- 2010s
- 2020s
1 Key Tower
2 Terminal Tower
3 200 Public Square
4 Sherwin-Williams Headquarters
5 Erieview Tower
6 One Cleveland Center
7 Fifth Third Center
8 Carl B. Stokes Federal Court House Building
9 Justice Center
10 Anthony J. Celebrezze Federal Building
11 PNC Center
12 The 9 Cleveland
13 The Lumen
14 Hilton Cleveland Downtown Hotel
15 AT&T Huron Road Building
16 Rhodes Tower
17 Eaton Center
18 Marriott at Key Center
19 The Beacon
20 AmTrust Financial Building
21 55 Public Square
22 The Centennial
23 North Point Tower
24 Standard Building
25 1100 Superior
26 Oswald Tower
27 1717 East Ninth Building
28 Keith Building
29 Artisan*
30 Reserve Square West
31 Reserve Square East
32 Superior Building
33 Landmark Office Towers Complex
34 One University Circle*
35 Ohio Savings Plaza
36 AECOM Building
37 Ameritech Center
38 Skyline 776
39 Westin Hotel Cleveland
40 Guardian Bank Building
41 Fenn Tower
42 Rockefeller Building
43 Parkview Apartments
44 Willson Tower*
45 U.S. Bank Centre
46 Lakeview Terrace Apartments*
47 W. O. Walker Center*
48 Frank J. Lausche State Office Building
49 Bohn Tower
50 Federal Reserve Bank of Cleveland
51 The Chesterfield Building

== Tallest buildings ==
This list ranks completed buildings in Cleveland that stand at least 200 ft (61 m) tall as of 2026, based on standard height measurement. This includes spires and architectural details but does not include antenna masts. The “Year” column indicates the year of completion. Buildings tied in height are sorted by year of completion with earlier buildings ranked first, and then alphabetically.

Was the tallest building in Cleveland upon completion

Rank	Name	Image	Location	Height ft (m)	Floors	Year	Purpose	Notes
1	Key Tower		127 Public Square 41°30′04″N 81°41′38″W	947 (288.7)	57	1991	Office	The tallest building between Philadelphia and Chicago. The tallest building in Ohio since 1991 and the tallest building completed in Cleveland in the 1990s. Originally built as the Society Center, the building is the headquarters of KeyCorp.
2	Terminal Tower		50 Public Square 41°29′53″N 81°41′38″W	708 (215.8)	52	1927	Mixed-use	The second-tallest building in Ohio, and the tallest building completed in the city in the 1920s. Terminal Tower was the 4th-tallest building in the world when it was completed in August 1927, and stood as the tallest building in North America outside New York City until the completion of Boston's Prudential Tower in 1964. It is the tallest residential-access building in the city and state, partially redeveloped from offices into apartments in 2018.
3	200 Public Square		200 Public Square 41°30′00″N 81°41′30″W	658 (200.6)	46	1985	Office	4th-tallest building in Ohio, and the tallest building completed in the city in the 1980s. Built as the Sohio Building for Standard Oil of Ohio and also known as the BP Building (HQ of BP America from 1985 until 1998 when BP moved to Chicago), the building is the regional headquarters of Huntington National Bank, and American headquarters of Cleveland-Cliffs Inc.. The public atrium features a series of water fountains that end at the Euclid Avenue wall with a falling water curtain that one can walk all the way around. The floor in the atrium is solid marble and the skylight allows one to see the stepped "crown" 658 feet straight up the facade from the tower floor.
4	Sherwin-Williams Headquarters		1426 West 3rd Street 41°29′57″N 81°41′46″W	616 (187.8)	36	2025	Office	Sixth-tallest building in Ohio and the tallest building completed so far in the city in the 2020s. Headquarters for Sherwin-Williams. Largest majority office complex constructed in Cleveland since the Ernst & Young Tower in 2013. The site is a former surface lot, as such it completes the final fourth corner of Public Square.
5	Erieview Tower		100 Erieview Plaza 41°30′19″N 81°41′19″W	529 (161.2)	40	1964	Office	Tenth-tallest building in Ohio and the tallest building completed in Cleveland in the 1960s. The building houses the Richard E. Jacobs' Galleria mall which was connected on its building grid in the 1980s and the Parker Hannifin downtown YMCA.
6	One Cleveland Center		1375 East 9th Street 41°30′13″N 81°41′21″W	450 (137.2)	31	1983	Office	Built by the same firm that constructed the Citigroup Center in New York City, the building comes to a prism point at its apex and resembles an electric razor.
7	Fifth Third Center		600 Superior Avenue 41°30′05″N 81°41′23″W	446 (135.9)	27	1991	Office	Built as the Bank One Center, the building sits directly across the street from Federal Reserve Bank of Cleveland.
8	Carl B. Stokes Federal Court House Building		801 West Superior Avenue 41°29′47″N 81°41′50″W	430 (131.1)	23	2002	Government	Tallest building completed in Cleveland in the 2000s. The building is the tallest federal building in Cleveland and Ohio. It is the tallest courthouse in Cleveland and the 2nd-tallest courthouse in Ohio, behind the Franklin County Courthouse in Columbus. Named after Carl B. Stokes, the first black mayor of Cleveland.
9	Justice Center		1200 Ontario Street 41°30′08″N 81°41′48″W	420 (128)	26	1977	Government	Tallest building completed in Cleveland in the 1970s. The building is part of the expansion of Group Plan and attaches to Cuyahoga County Jail Complex.
10	Anthony J. Celebrezze Federal Building		1240 East 9th Street 41°30′17″N 81°41′31″W	419 (127.7)	31	1967	Government	2nd-tallest federal building in Cleveland and Ohio. Named after the 49th Cleveland mayor Anthony J. Celebrezze, who was also a Kennedy cabinet member and US Appeals judge. Completely re-paneled from 2011 to 2016, the building contains Cleveland Bio-Metric Scan services for the United States passport processing and issuing offices. In 2025, the General Services Administration announced it would be selling the building.
11	PNC Center		1900 East 9th Street 41°30′02″N 81°41′15″W	410 (125)	35	1980	Office	Built to rival Ameritrust Tower that sits catty corner to the PNC, it is the regional headquarters of Pittsburgh-based PNC Financial Services which bought Cleveland-based National City Corp in 2008. Originally known as the National City Center, the building was renamed in 2009.
12	The 9 Cleveland		900 Euclid Avenue 41°29′59″N 81°41′09″W	390 (119)	28	1971	Mixed-use	Previously known as Cleveland Trust Tower, Ameritrust Tower, and 900 Euclid Tower. The building was redeveloped in 2014 as a mixed use hotel, retail, and residential building attached to the new Cuyahoga County Headquarters.
13	The Lumen		1600 Euclid Avenue 41°30′03″N 81°40′49″W	382 (116.4)	35	2020	Residential	Tallest all-residential building in the city and the tallest building in Playhouse Square. The Lumen marks the largest residential construction project in city in 40 years.
14	Hilton Cleveland Downtown Hotel		100 Lakeside Avenue 41°30′10″N 81°41′44″W	380 (115.8)	28	2016	Hotel	The tallest building completed in Cleveland in the 2010s. Tallest hotel in the city and the state of Ohio and also the largest hotel in Cleveland. The Hilton is attached to the Huntington Convention Center of Cleveland and the Global Center for Health Innovation. The hotel was built as a joint agreement between the City of Cleveland and Cuyahoga County.
15	AT&T Huron Road Building		750 Huron Road 41°29′53″N 81°41′12″W	365 (111.3)	22	1927	Office	Briefly the tallest building in Cleveland in 1927. Commonly known as Ohio Bell Building, previous names include the Ameritech Building and the SBC Center. The building is largely thought to be the inspiration for Superman's Daily Planet building. Jerry Siegel and Joe Shuster lived in Cleveland and this building was erected between 1926 and 1927, ten years before the publishing of the superhero's first appearance in 1938, Action Comics#1.
16	Rhodes Tower		2121 Euclid Avenue 41°30′12″N 81°40′32″W	363 (110.6)	20	1971	Education	Part of Cleveland State University. 4th-tallest educational building in the United States, and tallest in Cleveland. Originally known as the University Tower, the building was renamed in honor James A. Rhodes, who was governor at the time of the university's founding in 1964.
17	Eaton Center		1111 Superior Avenue 41°30′13″N 81°41′13″W	356 (108.5)	28	1983	Office	Originally built as the Superior Square Center, the building was renamed Eaton Center when Eaton became the main tenant in 1983. The building is now the headquarters of IBM in Cleveland and also the Cleveland Metropolitan School District since 2015.
18	Marriott at Key Center		127 Public Square 41°30′04″N 81°41′41″W	339 (103.3)	28	1991	Hotel	Second-tallest all-hotel building in the city, connected to the north side of Key Tower. Developed by Richard Jacobs Group as part of Society Center complex.
19	The Beacon		515 Euclid Avenue 41°30′01″N 81°41′23″W	338 (103)	29	2019	Residential	The Beacon is the second-tallest all-residential tower in the city after The Lumen and the first apartment tower constructed in the central downtown since 1974. The building was developed by Stark Enterprises and sits atop the 515 Euclid Avenue parking garage.
20	AmTrust Financial Building		800 Superior Avenue 41°30′06″N 81°41′19″W	308 (93.9)	23	1968	Office	Formerly known as Key Center, McDonald Investment Center, and Central National Bank Building.
21	55 Public Square		55 Public Square 41°30′00″N 81°41′44″W	300 (91.4)	22	1958	Mixed-use	Tallest building completed in Cleveland during the 1950s. Originally known as the Illuminating Building, the building is known for its multistory red 55. It was partially converted into apartments in 2023.
22	The Centennial		925 Euclid Avenue 41°30′04″N 81°41′12″W	289 (88.1)	21	1924	Office	Tallest building in Cleveland from 1924 to 1927. Formerly known as the 925 Building, Huntington Building, Union Commerce Building, and as the Union Trust Building, it is the largest office space in Cleveland and Ohio. The building was the second largest office space in the world at the time of completion in 1924.
23	North Point Tower		901-1001 Lakeside Avenue 41°30′24″N 81°41′27″W	285 (87)	20	1990	Office	
24	Standard Building		1370 Ontario Street 41°30′03″N 81°41′43″W	282 (86)	20	1925	Office	
25	1100 Superior		1100 Superior Avenue 41°30′11″N 81°41′11″W	279 (85)	23	1972	Office	Formerly known as the Diamond Building.
26	Oswald Tower		950 Main Street 41°30′04″N 81°42′13″W	279 (85)	22	2013	Office	Originally named after the major accounting firm of Ernst & Young, the building is part of Phase I of the Flats East Bank redevelopment project. It was the first downtown private office building constructed since 1992. Tallest building in the city west of Ohio State Route 2.
27	1717 East Ninth Building		1717 East 9th Street 41°30′07″N 81°41′17″W	275 (83.8)	21	1959	Residential	Also known as the East Ohio Building. Originally an office building, the tower was converted to into 223 apartments by 2015.
28	Keith Building		1621 Euclid Avenue 41°30′05″N 81°40′49″W	272 (82.9)	22	1922	Office	The building is connected to the Playhouse Square Center (PSC) and houses the offices of the Playhouse Square Foundation which runs PSC. The Connor Palace Theatre is located in the bottom floors of the building. The Keith Building is the 2nd-tallest building in Playhouse Square after The Lumen.
29	Artisan		10600 Chester Avenue 41°30′18″N 81°36′49″W	266 (81)	24	2023	Residential	Artisan is the tallest building in University Circle and Phase I of the Circle Square development project. The building is the 3rd-tallest all-residential building in the city after The Lumen and The Beacon.
31	Reserve Square West		1701 East 12th Street 41°30′11″N 81°41′07″W	266 (81.1)	26	1972	Residential	Also known as the Reserve Square Apartments. The complex was originally called Park Centre when it opened in 1973. Formerly included the Embassy Suites at Reserve Square.
32	Reserve Square East		1700 East 13th Street 41°30′12″N 81°41′04″W	266 (81.1)	26	1973	Residential	Also known as the Reserve Square Apartments. The complex was originally called Park Centre when it opened in 1973.
32	Superior Building		815 Superior Avenue 41°30′09″N 81°41′22″W	265 (80.8)	22	1922	Office	
33	Landmark Office Towers Complex		101 Prospect Avenue 41°29′50″N 81°41′33″W	259 (79)	22	1930	Office	
34	One University Circle		10730 Euclid Avenue 41°30′11″N 81°36′42″W	259 (79)	25	2018	Residential	The 2nd-tallest building in University Circle after Artisan.
35	Ohio Savings Plaza		1801 East 9th Street 41°30′06″N 81°41′15″W	253 (77)	17	1969	Office	
36	AECOM Building		1300 East 9th Street 41°30′15″N 81°41′27″W	253 (77)	21	1972	Office	Formerly known as the Penton Media Building, and the Bond Court Building.
37	Ameritech Center		45 Erieview Plaza 41°30′19″N 81°41′26″W	253 (77)	16	1983	Residential	Now known as The Bell Apartments. Originally an office building, converted to apartments in 2024.
38	Skyline 776		776 Euclid Avenue 41°30′00″N 81°41′16″W	250 (76)	23	2024	Residential	Formerly known as City Club Apartments.
39	Westin Hotel Cleveland		777 East St. Clair Avenue 41°30′13″N 81°41′29″W	222 (68)	22	1975	Hotel	Formerly known as Sheraton Cleveland City Centre Hotel and Crowne Plaza Downtown Cleveland.
40	Guardian Bank Building		617-637 Euclid Avenue 41°30′01″N 81°41′20″W	221 (67)	15	1896	Hotel	Tallest building in Cleveland from 1896 to 1922. Formerly the New England Building and later known as the National City Bank Building. Currently a Holiday Inn.
41	Fenn Tower		1983 East 24th Street 41°30′09″N 81°40′20″W	218 (66.4)	22	1930	Residential	
42	Rockefeller Building		614 West Superior Avenue 41°29′53″N 81°41′51″W	213 (65)	17	1905	Office	Designed by Knox & Elliot, the Rockefeller Building is the best example in Cleveland of the "Sullivanesque" style.
43	Parkview Apartments		1802 East 13th Street 41°30′09″N 81°41′01″W	213 (65)	18	1926	Residential	
44	Willson Tower	–	1919 East 55th Street 41°30′24″N 81°39′05″W	210 (64)	22	1971	Residential	Tallest building in Cleveland outside downtown and University Circle. Tallest building in the neighbourhood of Hough.
45	U.S. Bank Centre		1350 Euclid Avenue 41°30′01″N 81°40′55″W	210 (64)	16	1991	Office	Now known as the Cohen & Col. Center. Formerly the US Bank Centre and before that the Renaissance Center.
46	Lakeview Terrace Apartments		2700 Washington Avenue 41°29′32″N 81°42′36″W	208 (63)	19	1973	Residential	Tallest building in the neighborhoods of Ohio City and the Flats.
47	W. O. Walker Center		10524 Euclid Avenue 41°30′11″N 81°36′52″W	208 (63)	16	1989	Health	Shared between Cleveland Clinic and University Hospitals of Cleveland.
48	Frank J. Lausche State Office Building		615 West Superior Avenue 41°29′51″N 81°41′50″W	204 (62)	15	1979	Government	
49	Bohn Tower		1300 Superior Avenue 41°30′14″N 81°41′03″W	203 (62)	22	1972	Residential	
50	Federal Reserve Bank of Cleveland		1455 East 6th Street 41°30′07″N 81°41′25″W	203 (61.9)	13	1923	Office	
51	The Chesterfield Building		1801 East 12th Street 41°30′07″N 81°41′05″W	200 (61)	20	1967	Residential	

=== Greater Cleveland ===
Greater Cleveland
- Population: 2,171,877 (2024 estimate)
- Cities included: Cleveland, East Cleveland, Euclid, Lakewood

Number of tall buildings (2026)
- Taller than 100 m (328 ft): 19
- Taller than 150 m (492 ft): 5
- Taller than 200 m (656 ft): 3

Number of tall buildings — feet
- Taller than 200 ft (61.0 m): 55
- Taller than 300 ft (91.4 m): 21

There are several buildings in Greater Cleveland taller than 200 ft (61 m) that are located outside of Cleveland itself.

Rank	Name	Image	Location	Height ft (m)	Floors	Year	Purpose	Notes
1	Crystal Tower	–	East Cleveland 41°32′27″N 81°33′58″W	266 (81.1)	24	1968	Residential	Tallest building in Greater Cleveland outside of Cleveland.
2	Winton Place Apartments		Lakewood 41°29′35″N 81°46′44″W	264 (80.5)	28	1963	Residential	Named after automobile magnate Alexander Winton.
3	Lake Park Tower	–	East Cleveland 41°31′15″N 81°35′02″W	249 (76) (Note: Sources do not state the exact height of this building. This figure was determined using Google Earth by subtracting the altitude of the building's lowest main pedestrian open-air entrance from its highest architectural point.)	27	1970	Residential	
4	The Vista Apartments East	–	Euclid 41°37′24″N 81°30′05″W	207 (63)	21	1970	Residential	The complex, including its western neighbor, was formerly known as The Watergate and North Pointe Apartments.

== Tallest under construction or proposed ==
=== Under construction ===
The following table includes buildings under construction in Cleveland that are planned to be at least 200 ft (61 m) tall as of 2026, based on standard height measurement. The “Year” column indicates the expected year of completion. Buildings that are on hold are not included.

Name	Image	Height ft (m)	Floors	Year	Notes
Cleveland Clinic Neurological Institute Building		239 (73)	14	2026	
East Stokes		262 (80)	24	2028	Will become the second-tallest building in University Circle upon completion. Part of Phase 2 of the Circle Square development. Proposed in 2024.

=== Proposed ===
The following table includes approved and proposed buildings in Cleveland that are expected to be at least 200 ft (61 m) tall as of 2026, based on standard height measurement. Buildings whose exact planned heights are unknown are included at the bottom and sorted by floor count. A dash “–“ indicates information about the building's height, floor count, or year of completion is unknown or has not been released.

Name	Height ft (m)	Floors	Year	Status	Notes
Market Square (Phase 3)	264 (80)	18	–	Proposed	
Market Square (Phase 2)	235 (72)	16	–	Proposed	
Two Cleveland Center	228 (69)	17	–	Proposed	Proposed office building adjacent to One Cleveland Center, tailored for data center tenants.
Rock and Roll Land	–	17	2028	Proposed	Mixed-use entertainment venue and hotel, part of Stage 1B of Bedrock Cleveland's The Riverfront project.
The Riverfront	–	15 (Note: Minimum number of floors)	–	Proposed	Multiple towers that could exceed 200 ft (61 m) in height, with the tallest being at least 15 stories. Bedrock Cleveland development including multiple mixed-use towers in Stages 1B, 2, and 3.

== Timeline of tallest buildings ==
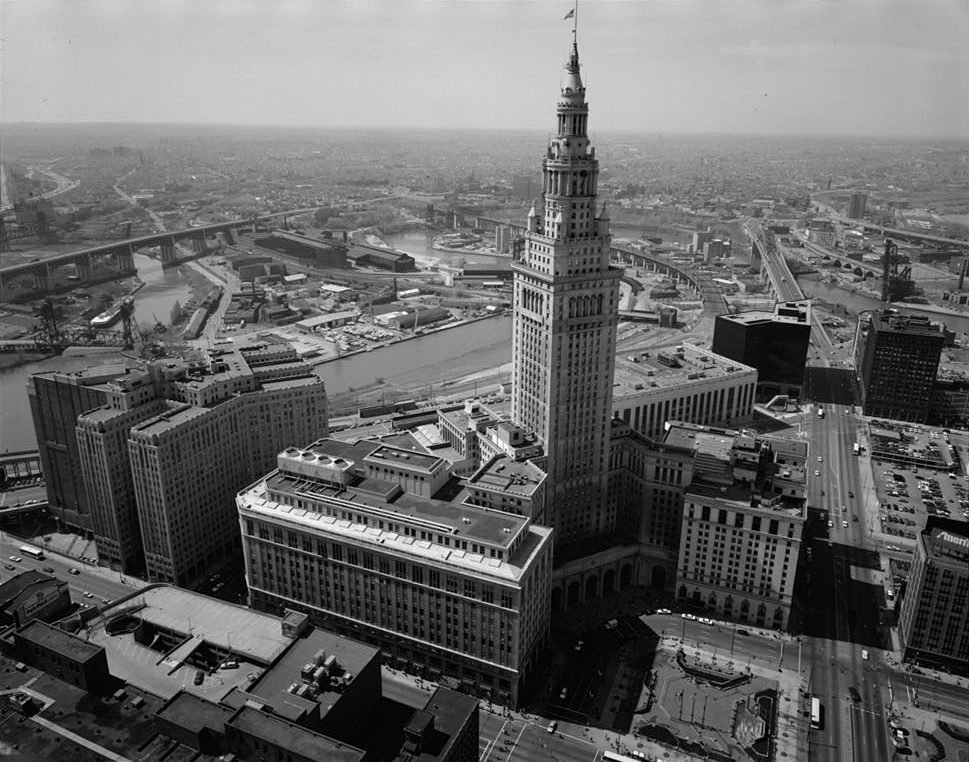
The Terminal Tower stood as the tallest building in Cleveland for 61 years, from 1930 until 1991.

This lists buildings that once held the title of tallest building in Cleveland.

Name	Image	Street address	Years as tallest	Height ft (m)	Floors	Reference
Society for Savings Building		127 Public Square	1889–1896	152 (46)	10	
Guardian Bank Building		623-629 Euclid Avenue	1896–1922	221 (67)	15	
Keith Building		1621 Euclid Avenue	1922–1924	272 (83)	22	
Union Trust Building		925 Euclid Avenue	1924–1927	289 (88)	22	Since renamed as the Huntington Bank Building.
Ohio Bell Building		750 Huron Road	1927–1930	364 (111)	24	Since renamed as the AT&T Huron Road Building.
Terminal Tower		50 Public Square	1930–1991	771 (235)	52	
Key Tower		127 Public Square	1991–present	947 (289)	57	

== See also ==
- List of tallest buildings in Ohio
- List of tallest buildings in Akron
- List of tallest buildings in Cincinnati
- List of tallest buildings in Columbus
- List of tallest buildings in Dayton
- List of tallest buildings in Toledo, Ohio
