= Children's Museum of Cleveland =

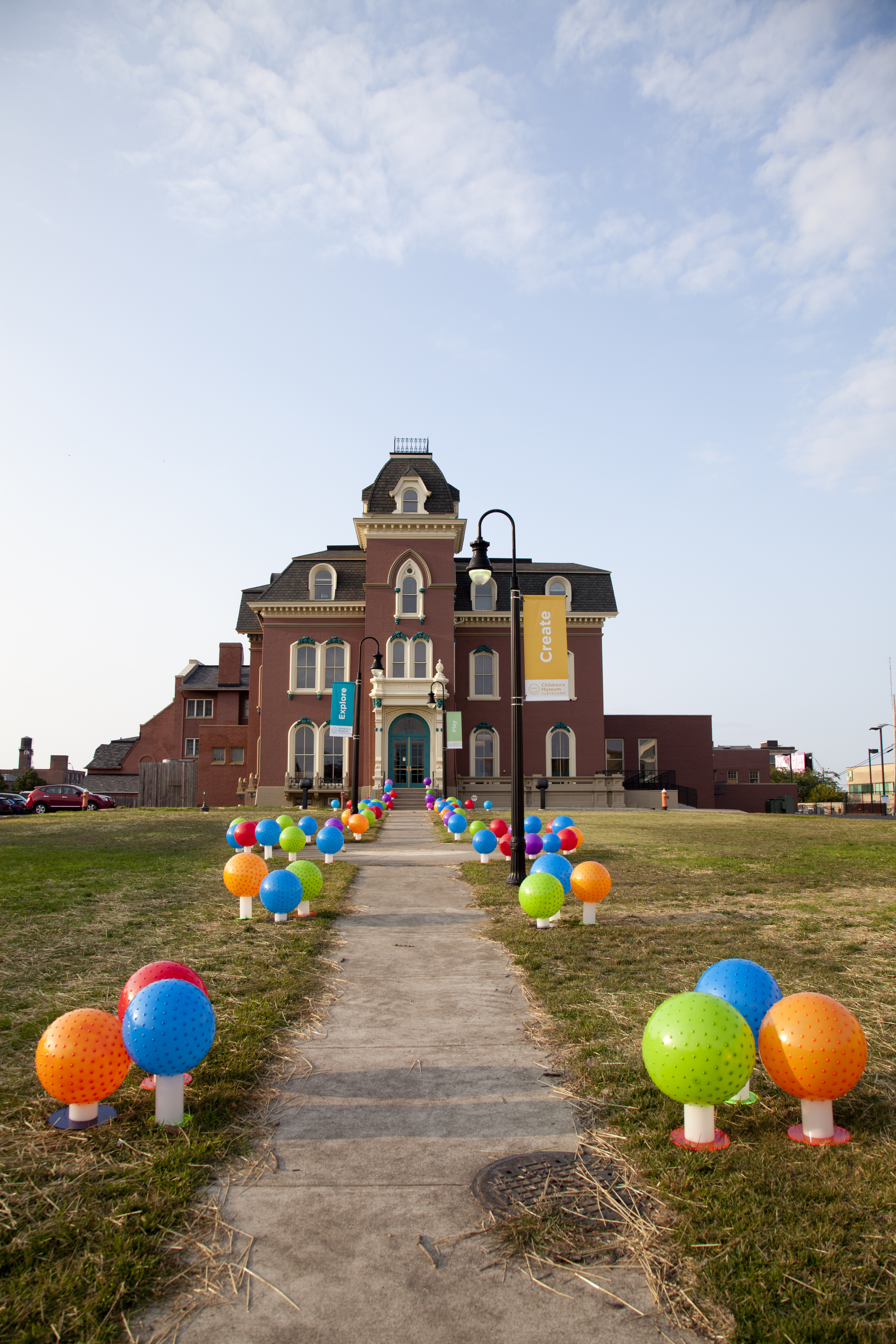
- Children's Museum of Cleveland, located in the former Stager-Beckwith Mansion

- Location within Cleveland Location within Ohio Location within the United States
- Established: 1981
- Location: 3813 Euclid Avenue; Cleveland, Ohio 44115
- Coordinates: 41°30′15″N 81°39′36″W
- Type: Children's museum
- Director: Maria Campanelli
- Public transit access: East 40th Street
- Website: cmcleveland.org

The Children's Museum of Cleveland (CMC) is an interactive space, designed to promote the education and development of young children ages 0–8. The Museum features eight hands-on exhibits that explore foundational learning skills through interactive play. The space was created to encourage child-directed play and exploration, with features designed to allow adults and caregivers to play and learn along with their child.

In addition to its exhibits, CMC offers an array of programs, events, and resources to extend the learning and community reach. CMC hosts field trips and classroom outreach programs to integrate museum learning into the early education experience. The Museum is known for its abundant accessible admissions programs, which reduce barriers to admission for low-income and special needs guests across Northeast Ohio. CMC hosts a range of annual events, including its ongoing CMC Center Stage performing arts program, free community access events, and special after-hours events for adults to enjoy playing like a kid.

CMC was established in 1981 and is located in the Midtown neighborhood of Cleveland, Ohio. The Museum occupies the historic Stager-Beckwith mansion, one of Cleveland's few remaining Millionaire's Row properties.

== History ==
Originally, it was located in the University Circle area of Cleveland until January 3, 2016. One University Circle was built on its former location.

After renovation and designing all new exhibits, the museum opened at its new location on November 6, 2017. The Children's Museum of Cleveland is fully ADA accessible.

== Exhibits ==
The museum has eight permanent exhibits:

- Adventure City: The Museum's largest exhibit resembles a micro-community, offering young children boundless opportunities to explore, interact with others, and engage in open-ended play. Two large play structures feature many small nooks, an interactive rooftop "garden", and a two-story climber to promote risky play, confidence building, and gross motor skill development. On the lower level of the exhibit, young learners can shop a pretend farmer's market, cook in a play kitchen, care for baby dolls in the doctor's office, drive and repair cars and a motorcycle in an auto shop, care for pretend animals in the hen house, and build creations of their own with loose parts available throughout the exhibit. This exhibit helps children learn through collaborative play, providing opportunities to learn about sharing, interacting with people from different backgrounds, problem-solving, leadership, and turn-taking. The abundance of loose parts and props allow children to engage their imaginations and develop their own play story. The climber and play structures support children's gross motor skill development and encourage the development of spatial awareness, which is foundational to STEM learning.
- Wonder Lab: The Wonder Lab is a water science laboratory, complete with two large water tables, a floor-to-ceiling scarf shooter, a bubble wall, play sinks, and more. Children can explore their natural curiosity and build a foundation of STEM learning by making observations and conducting experiments. Features like the scarf and ball shooter allow children to explore vacuums and air flow. Loose parts in the water tables and magnet wall ball track enable children to change the environment, practice early engineering skills, and explore cause-and-effect. Water table features showcase complex science in a playful way, including the Bernoulli effect, whirlpools, and laminar flow. Young children can engage in sensory play at the water tables, using tools and props to practice scooping, pouring, filling, and even some splashing.
- Arts & Parts: The Museum's art studio combines creative and analytical thinking to bridge the imaginary gap between science and art. The art stations offer process-driven projects that explore different artistic methods and mediums in processes that are developmentally accessible to young children. The projects are inspired by famous artists from across the globe, and rotate in a changing monthly theme. The space also highlights tinker stations, offering opportunities for hands-on play with real tools, loose parts, and different mechanisms such as circuits and engineering materials. The open-ended nature of this exhibit promotes exploration and creativity, allowing children to engage their creativity and express their emotions. The abundance of loose parts encourage inventive thinking, trial and error, and experimentation, promoting foundational STEM learning skills.
- Making Miniatures: The second floor of the museum features an expansive dollhouse collection from local Cleveland area collectors Cathy & Emma Lincoln. The dollhouses showcase scenes from many different walks of life, corners of the world, and stretches of the imagination. Children can explore the collection, utilizing mini flashlights to complete a scavenger hunt. The space also offers interactive areas with a large-scale dollhouse structure, lego and duplo brick building rooms, and small-world play stations. Dollhouses are a great mechanism to engage young children in conversation and develop verbal and cognitive skills. The variety of cultures represented throughout the exhibit also provide opportunities for children to gain exposure to different cultures, and engage in conversation.
- Bubbles: The Museum's newest exhibit offers a joyful environment for play and exploration. Featuring five unique installations, Bubbles is designed to embrace children's curiosity and playfulness through hands-on bubble play. A custom bubble-blowing wall creates a developmentally-appropriate opportunity for the youngest learners to engage, creating a swell of bubbles when children apply solution to the pinhole air blowers. The fog bubbler allows children to blow magical bubbles filled with fog, that release the breath of fog when the bubble is popped. Large-scale bubble trays present the chance for kids to create larger-than-life bubbles, using their bodies to stretch and their oral motor skills to blow air in a concentrated force. The bubble blizzard creates a flurry of bubbles at the push of a button, promoting movement as children jump to catch the bubbles, and promoting eye tracking as young children watch the bubbles float across the air. A large-scale bubble curtain gives children the chance to pull a screen of bubble solution larger than themselves, practicing motor skills precision, and patience.
- Theater: The Theater features a fully operational performance environment built for play and professional engagements alike. The floor-level stage allows children to safely and accessibly explore the spotlight. The wardrobe area presents off-stage essentials such as a make-up mirror, prop shelves, and costumes to bring any performance to life. The tech booth and ticketing station give children the chance to explore the supporting roles of theater production, putting sound effects and lighting changes in the hands of young creators. This space is also fully equipped with professional lighting and AV equipment, providing a high-quality environment for professional performances through the Museum's CMC Center Stage performing arts program. This program brings free and developmentally-appropriate arts performances from professional artists and performance groups to the small stage, providing early exposure to the arts for an early childhood audience. Theater play provides children with space to explore their emotions, express their thoughts and feelings, and build confidence. The different roles present organic opportunities for children to work collaboratively, share ideas, and practice leadership skills. Arts performances can expose children to different cultures, life experiences, feelings, and ideas, encouraging curiosity, empathy, creativity, and social-emotional development.
- Playlist: In Playlist, kids can move their bodies and interact with music from around the world through shadow-play on the Museum's custom silhouette screens. Using both prop and real instruments like tambourines and drums, young learners can join the rotating musical accompaniments. The shadow screens feature rotating motion graphics, and provide kids the opportunity to engage with shadow play, which promotes visual tracking, movement, and self-awareness.
- Meadow: This space was created for the community's youngest learners, focusing on children ages 0–3. The Meadow offers a clean, bright, and sensory-rich environment for young children to explore safely, interact with others, and learn about the world around them. The exhibit provides space for early motor skill development, with stairs, ramps, tunnels and slides to practice movement, balance, and coordination. Mirrored surfaces allow children to practice visual tracking, enhance their social-emotional recognition, and begin to develop self-awareness. Loose parts encourage fine motor skill development by providing items to grasp, hold, throw, and place. Soft surfaces let children engage in tummy time, and safely practice crawling, jumping, walking, and standing up.
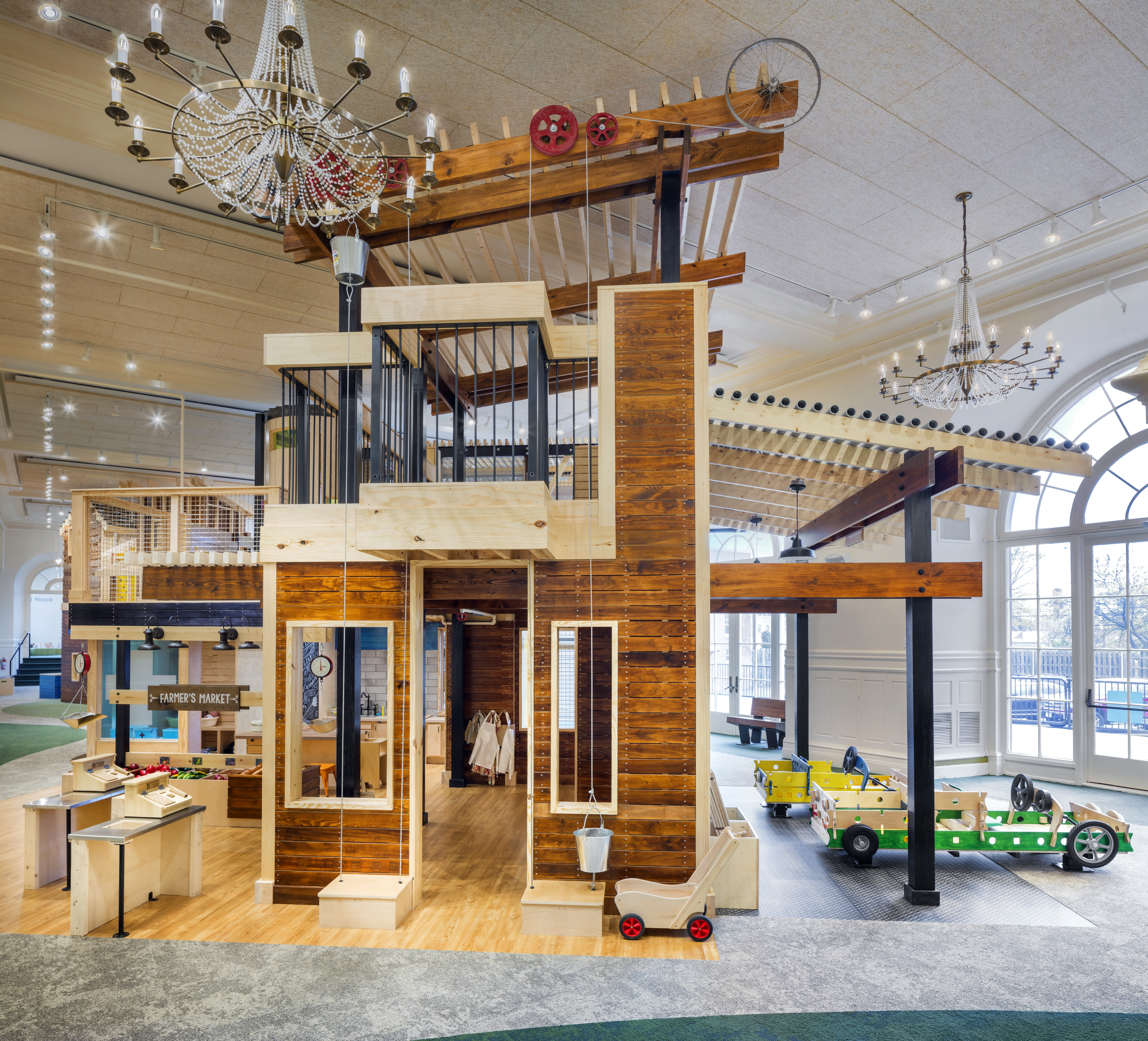
Adventure City

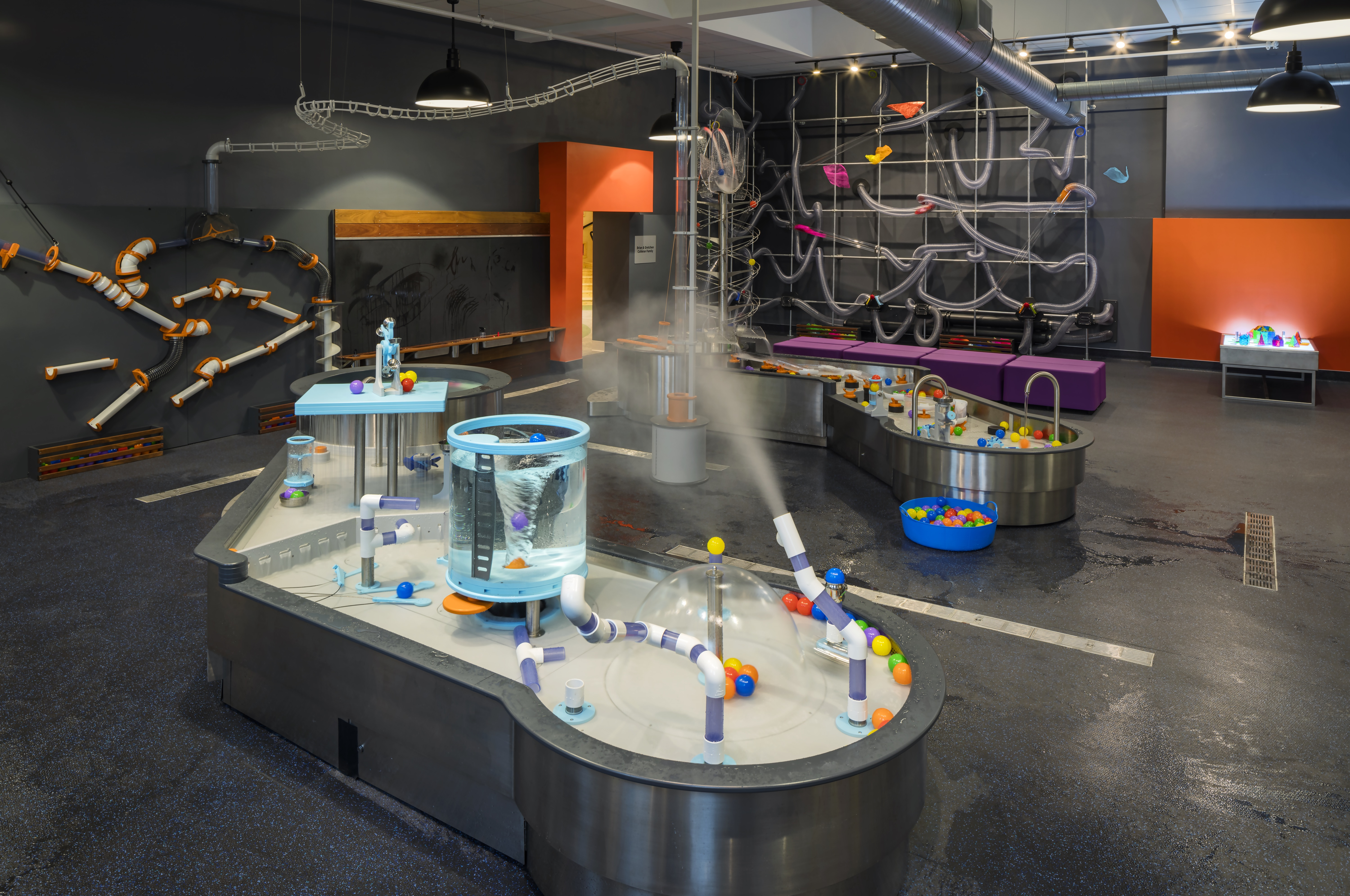
Wonder Lab

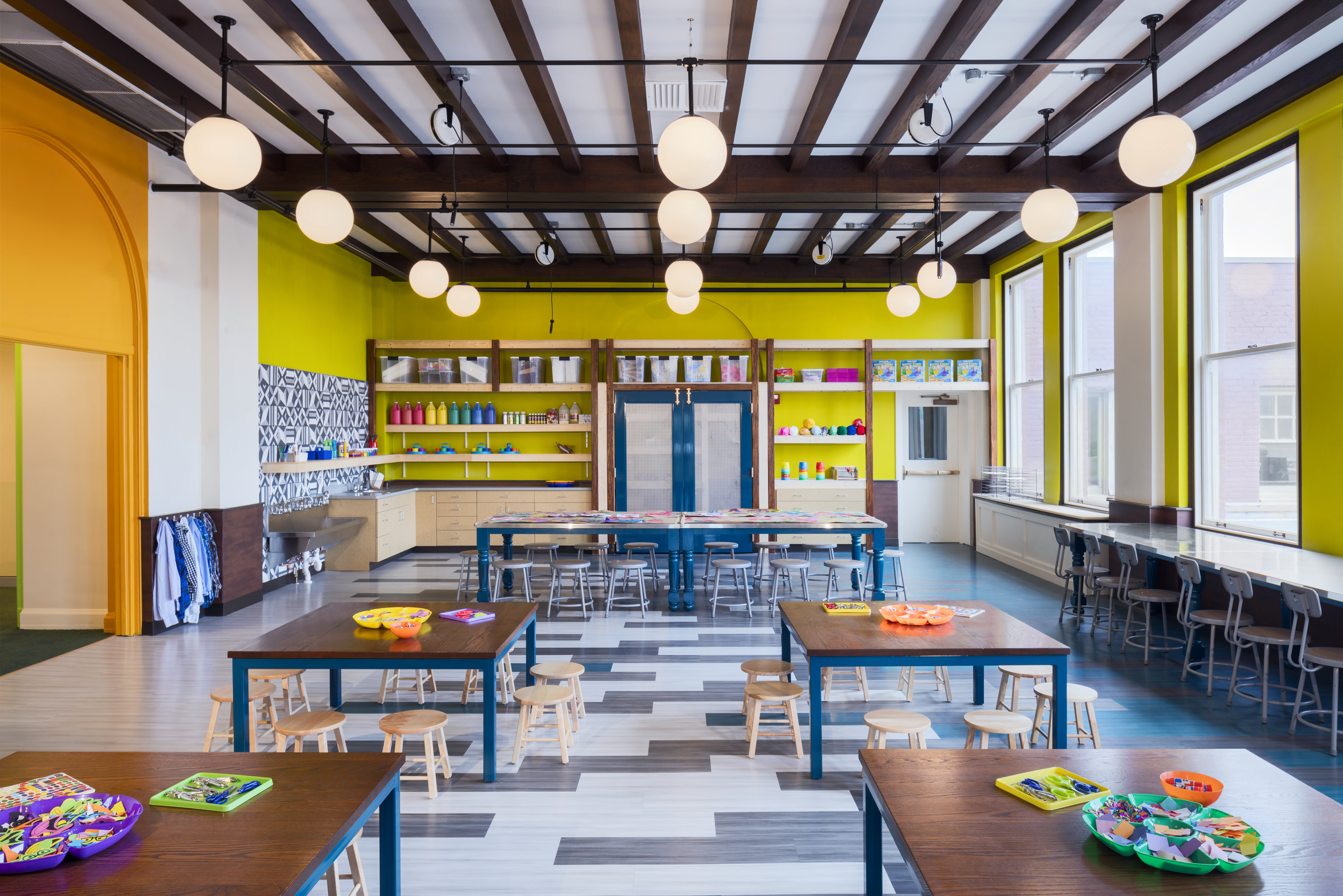
Arts & Parts

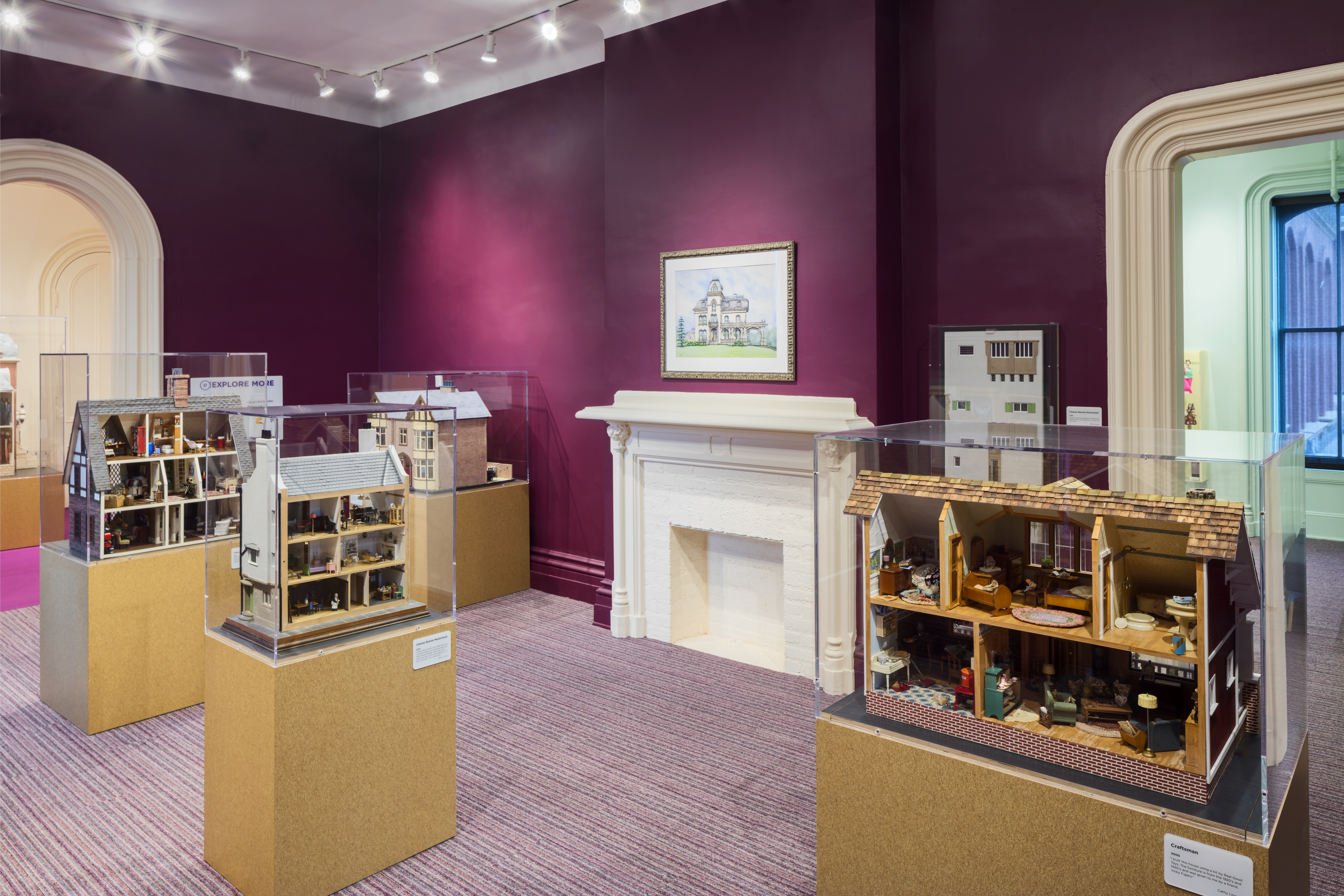
Making Miniatures
