= Artisan (Cleveland) =

Residential building in Cleveland, Ohio

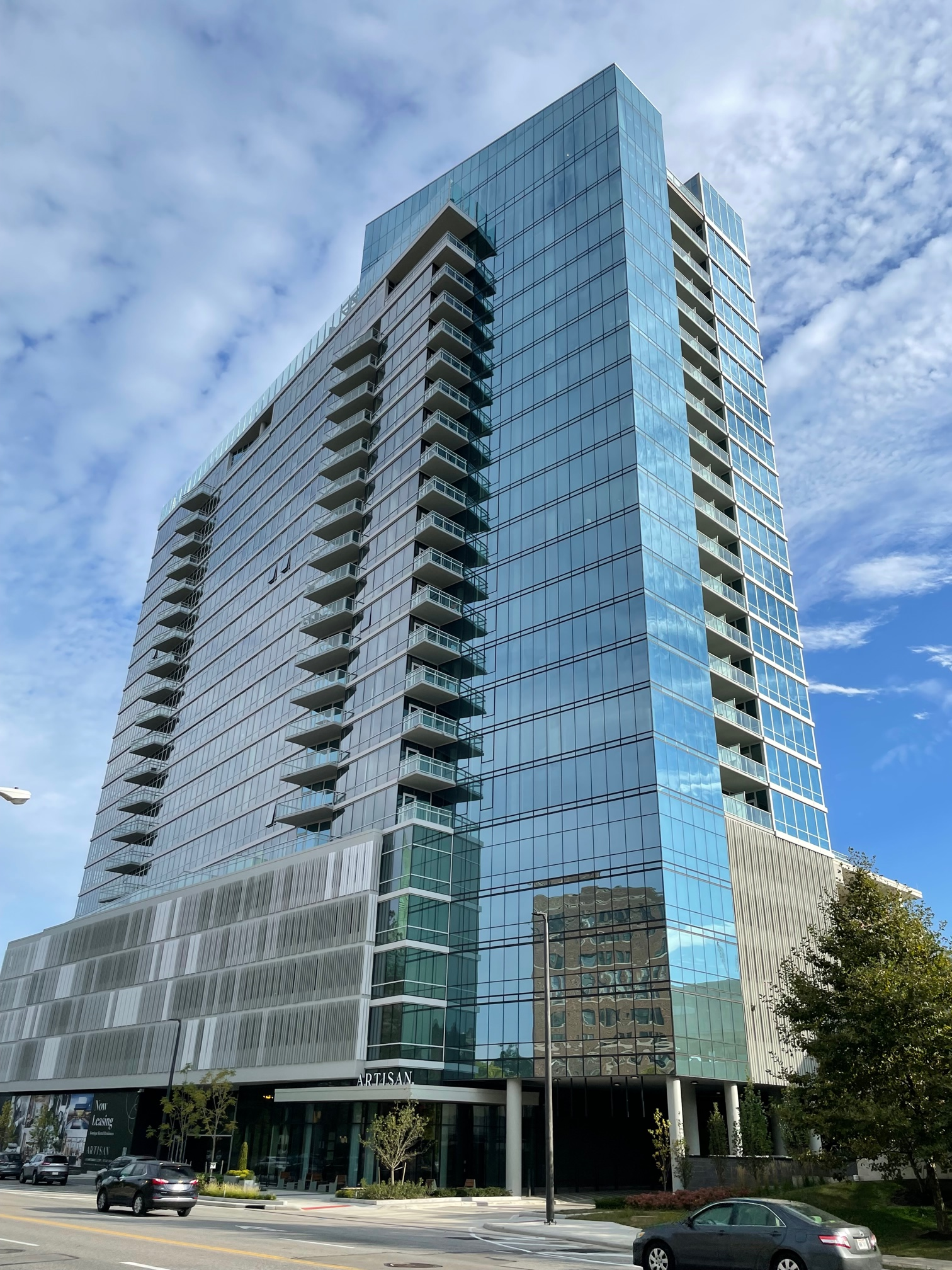
- Artisan in 2023
- Interactive map of the Artisan area

General information
- Type: Residential
- Architectural style: Contemporary
- Location: 10600 Chester Avenue; Cleveland, Ohio
- Coordinates: 41°30′18.50″N 81°36′49.21″W
- Construction started: 2021.
- Completed: 2023
- Cost: $80 million
- Owner: The NRP Group

Height
- Roof: 267
- Top floor: 24

Technical details
- Floor count: 24
- Floor area: 39,205 m^{2} / 422,000 ft^{2}

Design and construction
- Architect: FitzGerald Associates Architects
- Developer: Midwest Development Partners; White Oak Reality Partners; AMHigley

Other information
- Number of units: 298

Artisan is a high rise apartment tower located in the University Circle district of Cleveland. The 24-story building stands 267-foot (81 m) tall, making it the tallest in the city outside of downtown. It was completed in 2023.

== Development and Circle Square ==
Cleveland-based Midwest Development Partners first proposed the mixed-use $417 million Circle Square project in 2014, with Artisan and the 9-story Library Lofts atop a new Martin Luther King, Jr. Branch of the Cleveland Public Library encompassing the first phase of construction. Plans for Artisan were presented to the city planning commission for approval in September 2020 and construction began shortly after in April 2021. During construction of Artisan, the developers received a Transformational Mixed-Use Development (TMUD) tax credit from the state in 2022 worth $8 million to help advance future phases of development

== See also ==
- List of tallest buildings in Cleveland
