= AmTrust Financial Building =

Commercial skyscraper building in Cleveland, Ohio

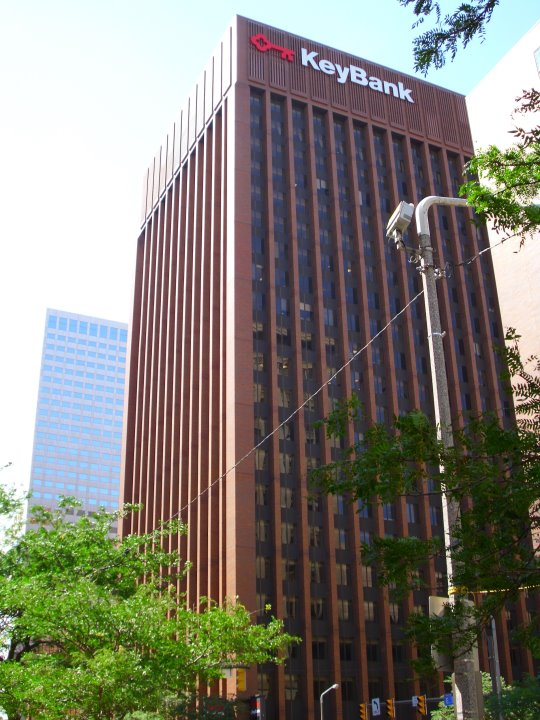
- AmTrust Financial Center on Superior and East Ninth
- Interactive map of the AmTrust Financial Building area

General information
- Status: Completed
- Type: Office
- Location: 800 Superior Avenue, Cleveland, Ohio, U.S
- Coordinates: 41°30′6.35″N 81°41′19.22″W
- Opening: 1969

Height
- Roof: 308 ft (94 m)

Technical details
- Floor count: 23

Design and construction
- Architect: Charles Luckman
- Developer: Tishman Speyer Properties

AmTrust Financial Building, formerly known as McDonald Investment Center, Key Center and the Central National Bank Building, is a commercial high-rise building in Cleveland, Ohio. The building rises 308 feet (94 m) in Downtown Cleveland. It contains 23 floors, and was completed in 1969. When first constructed, the tower stood as the fifth-tallest building in Cleveland. The architect who designed the building was Charles Luckman.

== History ==
=== Central National Bank ===
In 1965, Central National Bank decided to build a new headquarters on the flank of the Erieview Plan (created by architect I.M. Pei). Central National Bank was one of Cleveland's largest banks of the 1960s. With growth in banking, Central National Bank needed space for a new tower. In 1966, demolition of the 6-floor Ellington Apartments (which had caught fire in 1960) began. In 1967, ground was broken for the 23-story red bricked edifice. It was designed by Charles Luckman of the New York City-based The Luckman Partnership architectural firm. In 1969, the Central National Bank Tower officially opened.

In late 1977, some bricks fell off the Central National Bank Building, with no fatalities. In 1979, engineers found a problem with an additive used in the brickwork mortar, Dow Chemical's Sarabond. Subsequently, the Central National Bank sued Dow Chemical in 1980 and won their case. Brickwork remodification took over two years to complete. The building has almost 2,000,000 bricks which all had to be resealed.

=== McDonald & Co. Investments ===
In 1986, Society Bank bought out Central National Bank and its assets. In 1991, McDonald & Co. Investments bought the tower, which placed its "McD" logo on the top of the building. KeyCorp bought McDonald in 1998, which added its skeleton key onto the new McDonald Investments logo and the building became known as the "McDonald Investments Center." In 2004, KeyCorp management creating a functional unit and rebranded McDonald as "McDonald Financial Group," precipitating another new logo to be placed on the top of the building. However, the building remained McDonald Investments Center. The building was acquired by IPC US Real Estate Investment Trust, a Toronto-based firm in July 2002 for $45M.

=== UBS ===
In 2007, McDonald was sold to Swiss-based UBS, causing the building to be renamed to Key Center. In February 2007, new signage was placed on the street level. UBS will have a Cleveland Office in the building. In June 2007, an electronic stock and news ticker was installed giving people on the streets news and business information, as in New York City's Times Square.

=== AmTrust Financial Services ===
In 2011 the building was placed for sale via an online auction where it was purchased by a subsidiary of AmTrust North America (AFSI), a P&C insurance carrier who is based in New York, New York, but had the majority of its operations in a Cleveland suburb, Seven Hills. Moving most of its Ohio operations into this building has helped revitalize the downtown area dubbed the Nine-Twelve District.

== Location ==
The Amtrust Financial Building is located on the southwest corner of East 9th and Superior, two of the major roads in Cleveland. East 9th is considered to be the east boundary of central downtown, and Superior (US route 6) is a major east–west artery route.

== Current occupants ==
- AmTrust Financial Services
- National General Insurance (formerly GMAC Insurance)
- Key Bank
- ASMGi

== Firms involved in construction ==
- Tishman Speyer Properties - developer
- Kelley Steel Erectors
- Cantor Seinuk Group Inc. (The firm building the Freedom Tower of the World Trade Center)
- John W. Blatt Elevator Consulting Inc.

== See also ==
- List of tallest buildings in Cleveland
