= Eaton Center (Cleveland) =

Skyscraper in Cleveland, Ohio

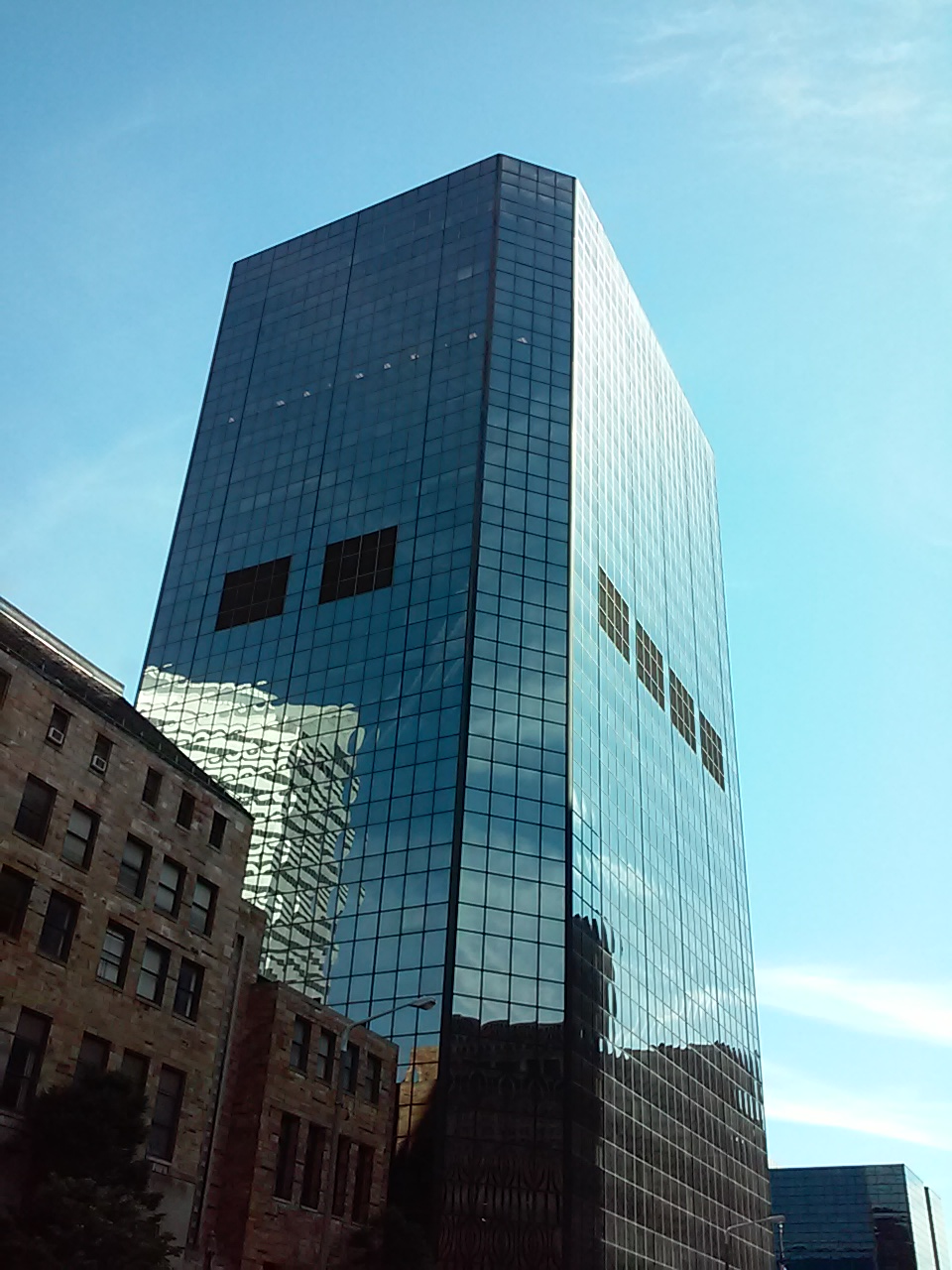

- Location within Ohio
- Alternative names: Superior Square

General information
- Status: Completed
- Type: Skyscraper
- Architectural style: Modernism
- Classification: Office
- Location: Nine-Twelve District, 1111 Superior Avenue; Eaton Square, Cleveland, Ohio, United States
- Coordinates: 41.503562°N 81.686764°W
- Current tenants: Eaton Corporation
- Construction started: 1981
- Completed: 1983
- Renovated: 1995; 2014
- Client: Catholic Diocese of Cleveland
- Owner: American Landmark Properties

Height
- Architectural: 356 feet (109 m)
- Tip: 356 feet (109 m)
- Roof: 356 feet (109 m)

Technical details
- Floor count: 28
- Lifts/elevators: 16
- Grounds: 615,000 square feet (57,100 m^{2})

Design and construction
- Architecture firm: Skidmore, Owings & Merrill LLP
- Developer: Oliver Tyrone Corporation
- Structural engineer: Skidmore, Owings & Merrill LLP
- Main contractor: Turner Construction

Other information
- Parking: Adjacent parking garage

The Eaton Center is a skyscraper in downtown Cleveland, Ohio. The building has 28 stories and rises to a height of 356 feet (109 m). The structure was one of the structures that expanded Cleveland's central business district eastward in the early-1980s building boom in the city. The tower is now home to the Cleveland Metropolitan School District.

== History ==
Eaton Center sits on the former site of a local college. St. John's College established in 1928 by the Roman Catholic Diocese of Cleveland and had begun to experience a downturn in enrollment. The college built a dormitory in 1964 to boost enrollment, but when numbers still didn't increase, the dormitory became offices for the Catholic Diocese of Cleveland. St. John's College ultimately closed in 1975, and the facilities merged with the adjacent St. John's Cathedral.

After reading and hearing that Cleveland's corporate community needed office space, Bishop James Hickey offered the St. John's College land for office space development. In October 1980 as papers were signed, Pope John Paul II appointed Bishop James Hickey as Archbishop of Washington, D.C., so Hickey's successor Bishop Anthony Pilla continued with the deal. St. John's College would be demolished, but the land would be owned by the Catholic Diocese of Cleveland. The proceeds of the land lease would be used by the Catholic Diocese of Cleveland for seminaries and educational ministries.

Developer Oliver Tyrone Corporation studied St. Peter's Evangelical Lutheran Church's similar land deal in New York City with Citigroup when its famed Citigroup Center tower was built in 1977.

== Construction ==
Demolition of the St. John's College began in January 1981, due to the installation of Bishop Anthony Pilla. There was mass of deconsecration of the St. John's College building. After the mass, the demolition would begin. By February 1981, plans were shown for the Superior Square Center, the construction name for the Eaton Center while it was being built. Turner Construction was announced as the general contractor of the Superior Square building.

In July 1981, concrete forms and cranes were present at the site. Superior Square became Cleveland's second tallest building built with concrete, with the first tallest building being the National City Center 1978-80. Superior Square became Cleveland's tallest glass-skinned building. Superior Square is octagonal in shape. One section is 25 stories and another rises 28 stories.

In 1983, Superior Square opened for business, but in July 1983, Cleveland-based Eaton Corporation moved from Erieview Tower to Superior Square. The Superior Square Tower was renamed Eaton Center soon after. Eaton relocated to its new 580,000-square-foot facility, also named Eaton Center, in Beachwood, Ohio in early 2013. The reincorporation in Ireland as part of the Cooper merger involved establishing a registered head office in Dublin, Ireland, but operational headquarters remain in Ohio.

== See also ==
- List of tallest buildings in Cleveland
