= North Point Office Building and Tower =

Complex in Ohio, United States

Coordinates: 41°30′23.92″N 81°41′27.23″W

North Point Tower
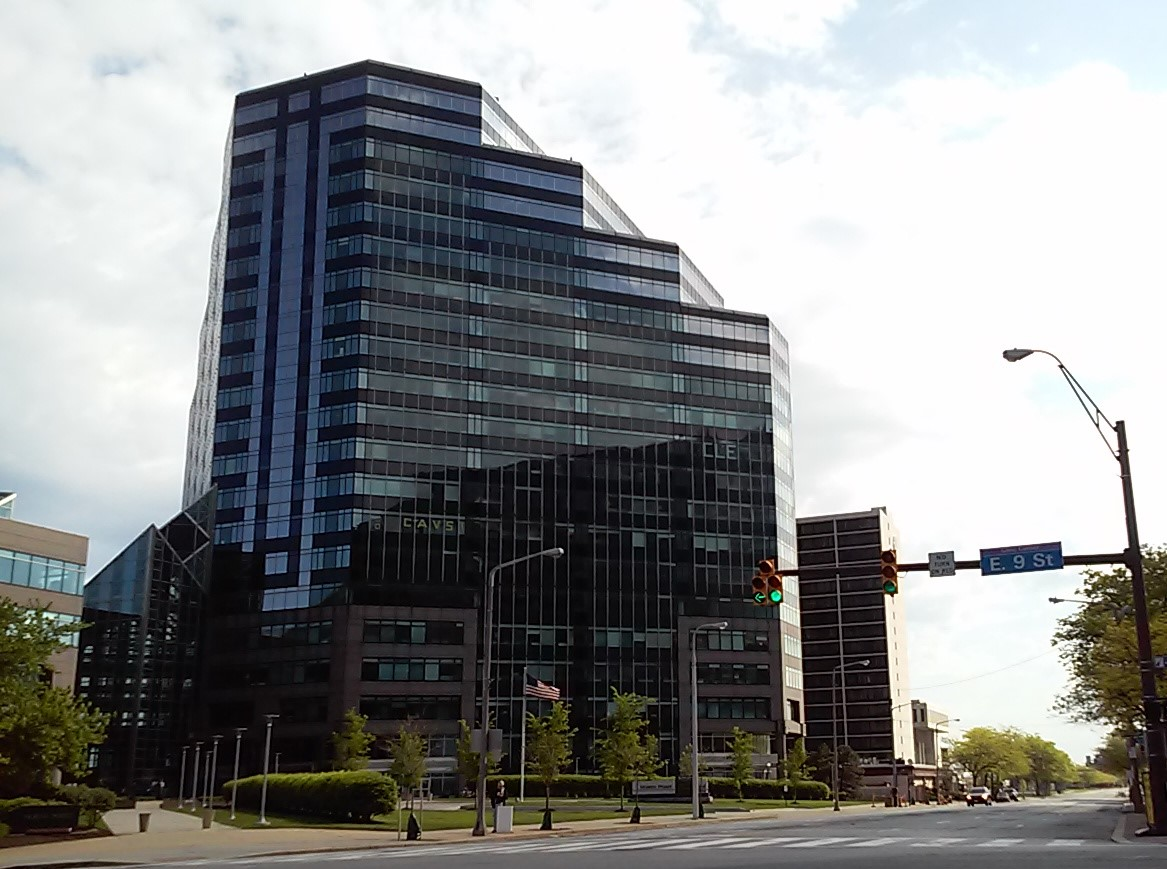
- Interactive map of the North Point Tower area

General information
- Type: Office
- Location: 901-1001 Lakeside Avenue; Cleveland, Ohio; United States
- Construction started: 1989
- Completed: 1990

Height
- Roof: 86.86 m (285 ft)

Technical details
- Size: 587,000 sq. ft.
- Floor count: 20

Design and construction
- Architect: Payto Architects, Inc.

Other information
- Public transit access: East 9th–North Coast

The North Point Office Building and Tower (also known as North Point I and II) is a complex consisting of a high-rise and an office building. It is located in Downtown Cleveland, Ohio at the northeast corner of East 9th Street and Lakeside Avenue. It is the home of Cleveland founded law firm, Jones Day and Cleveland founded professional service firm, EY.

== Proposal ==
North Point Tower was proposed by Cleveland Press owner Joseph Cole in 1979. In March 1980, The North Point Plan was revealed as a 500-foot (150 m), 41-story office tower with a glass-enclosed atrium. There were plans to build a hotel on the site and an atrium displaying Press printing machines to the public. The tower would have been built on top of the 1957 structure. When the Cleveland Press folded on June 17, 1982, the North Point Plan did too.

Construction of a more modest North Point I began in 1983, and the Cleveland Press building was demolished. It was completed in 1985. North Point II (North Point Tower) was added in 1990.

== Design ==
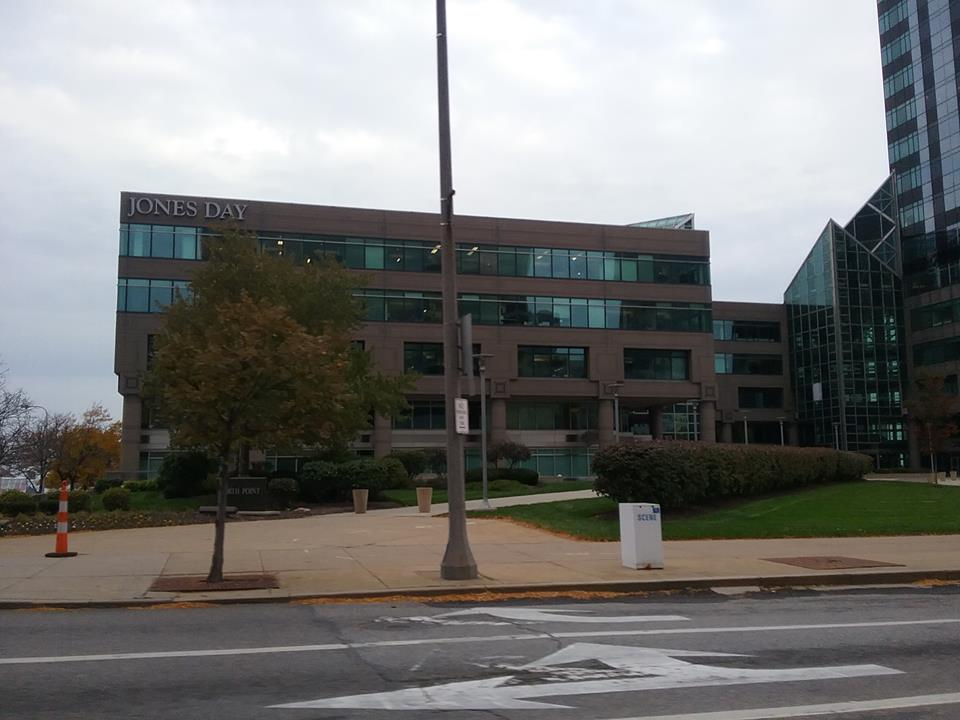
Jones Day in relation to tower

North Point I (North Point Building) is an unusual office structure with seven levels. Five of the levels are above grade with two below, atop foundation of the former Press building. Its most distinctive features are its large triangular floor plans, which are split by a nine story glass angled atrium with views of Cleveland's lakefront and North Coast Harbor. It is also linked by skybridge to a 1,000 car parking garage to the north and to its counterpart, North Point II to the east. Jones Day is headquartered in Phase I.

North Point II (North Point Tower) reaches 20 stories and 286 ft (87 m). It holds 587,000 square feet (54,500 m^{2}) of office space and is clad in colorful tile panels. It was designed by Cleveland architect Jerry Payto. The two phases (North Point I and North Point II) were built at a combined cost of $125 million and were privately financed.

The building features blue and black strip Pattern design, the blue lines contains glass windows that goes around the Building

== See also ==
- List of tallest buildings in Cleveland
