= Oswald Tower (building) =

Skyscraper in Cleveland, Ohio

Coordinates: 41°30′4″N 81°42′14″W

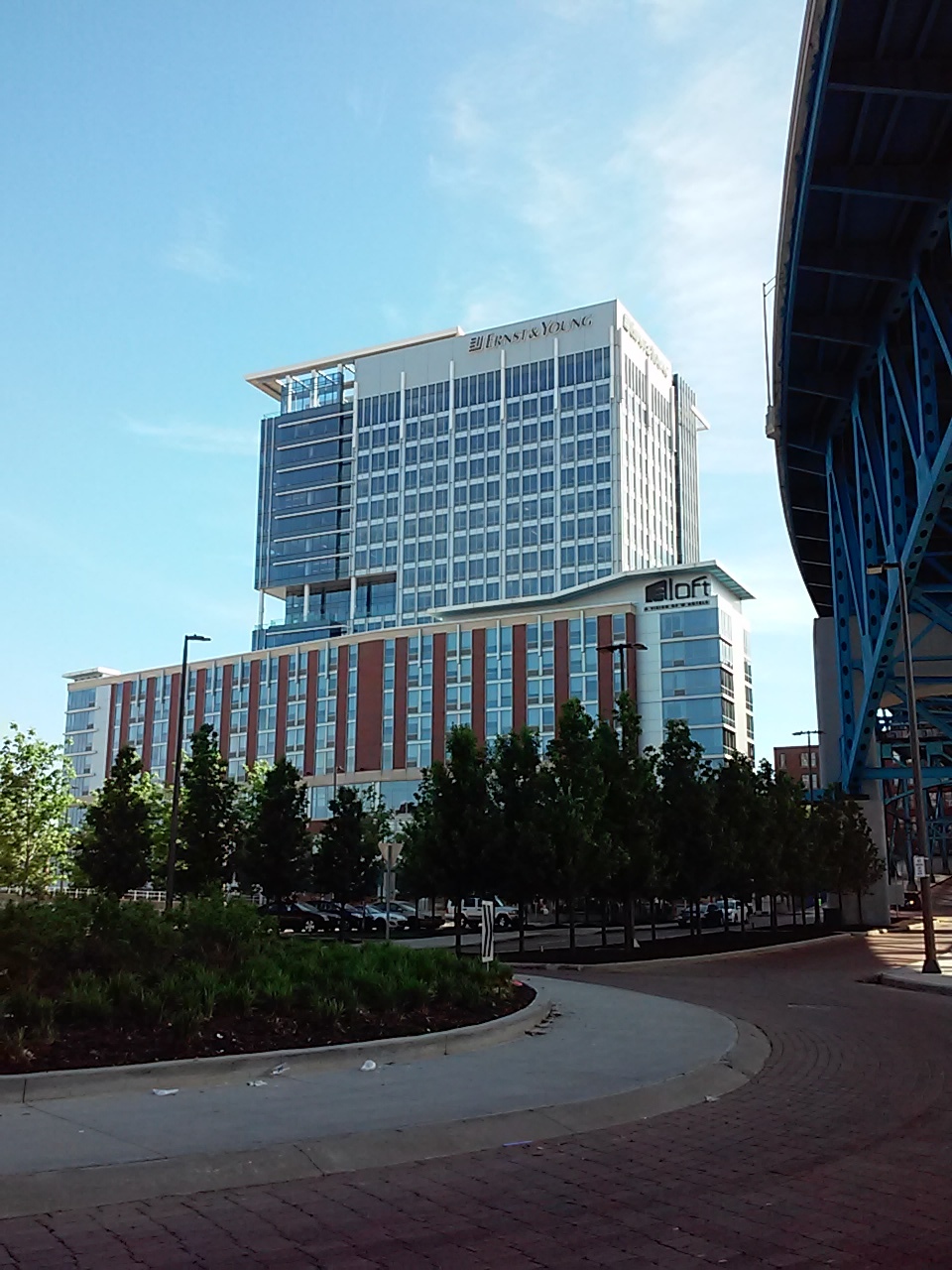
- Interactive map of the Oswald Tower area
- Former names: Flats East Bank Tower; Ernst & Young Tower

General information
- Type: Office
- Location: 950 Main Street; Cleveland, Ohio; United States
- Construction started: 2011
- Completed: 2013

Height
- Roof: 330 ft (100 m)

Technical details
- Floor count: 23
- Floor area: 480,000 sq ft (45,000 m^{2})

Design and construction
- Architect: Gensler
- Main contractor: JLJI

Other information
- Public transit access: Flats East Bank

The Oswald Tower is a skyscraper in downtown Cleveland, Ohio, formerly known as the Ernst & Young Tower. It stands on the east bank of the Flats completed in 2013. It is an example of post-modern glass curtain and steel studded construction. The building rises 23 stories to a height of 330 feet (100 m) and offers 480,000 square feet (45,000 m^{2}) of office space.

The major tenant was previously the accounting firm Ernst & Young, which moved from the Huntington Bank Building to the new and then-namesake tower in 2013. Ernst & Young traces its roots back to the firm of Ernst & Ernst, which was established in 1903 in Cleveland. E & Y moved to the North Point Tower in 2023.

== Tenants ==
The building is also the Cleveland office of these law firms: Cleveland-based Tucker Ellis, and Columbus, Ohio-based Porter Wright Morris Arthur.

In addition to these major tenants the tower was home to the former Cleveland-based metal chemical company OM Group which changed its name to Vectra in 2017 then moved its Headquarters to St. Louis, and is the Cleveland office of San Francisco-based financial corporation Wells Fargo. The tower has an attached Aloft Hotels-branded hotel with 150 guest rooms and the WXYZ bar.

=== List of tenants ===
(as of August 2024)

- Oswald Companies (Headquarters) Anchor Tenant 100,000 sq. ft.
- Porter Wright Morris Arthur (Cleveland office HQ)
- Tucker Ellis (Headquarters)
- Wells Fargo (regional Cleveland office)
- McKinsey & Company (Cleveland HQ)
- Gilbane Building Co. (Cleveland Construction HQ)
- Winter | Trimacco Co., LPA (Cleveland office)

== See also ==
- List of tallest buildings in Cleveland
