= Keith Building =

Skyscraper in downtown Cleveland, Ohio

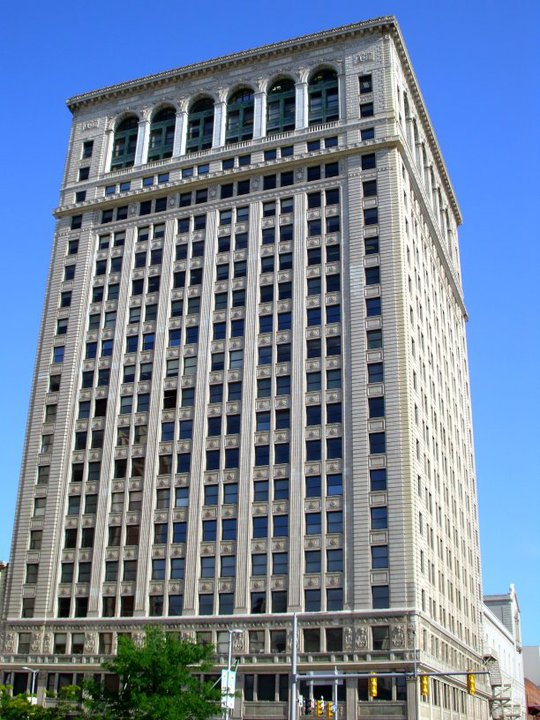
- The Keith Building
- Interactive map of the Keith Building area
- Alternative names: B.F. Keith Theatre Building

General information
- Type: Commercial offices Theatre
- Architectural style: Beaux-Arts
- Location: 1621 Euclid Avenue; Cleveland, Ohio
- Coordinates: 41.501286°N 81.680284°W
- Completed: 1922

Height
- Roof: 83 m (272 ft)

Technical details
- Floor count: 22

Design and construction
- Architect: Rapp & Rapp

The Keith Building is a skyscraper in downtown Cleveland, Ohio's Playhouse Square theater district. The Keith is 272 feet tall and 21 stories, and houses the Palace Theater, a former flagship theater of the Keith vaudeville circuit. As of 2017, the renovated building is in use as an office tower.

At the time of its construction in 1922, the Keith was the tallest building in Cleveland until 1924 when it was overtaken by The 925 Building. It is also the tallest performing arts-related building in Ohio. From 1922 through the mid-1950s, the Keith also had a multi-story electric sign on its roof, claimed to be the largest electric sign in the world at the time of its construction.

== History ==
Owner Edward Albee II named it in memory of B. F. Keith, his former business partner and one of the most important vaudeville theatre circuit owners in the history of American theater. The Palace Theater housed in the Keith Building is Playhouse Square Center's second-largest theater (in seating capacity), which was the flagship for the Keith vaudeville circuit. The Keith was added to the National Register of Historic Places in 1978 as the Playhouse Square Group consortium. This in part spurred the city of Cleveland to donate $3.15 million in economic work grants to spear head the starting of the renovation of Playhouse Square as it is known today.

In 1980, engineering consultant firm, Barber & Hoffman, identified several structural problems with the then over 55-year-old building and by 2000 had completed a $3 million restoration of the facade and several cosmetic issues. In early 2015, the K & D Group entered into an agreement to purchase the Keith for what was reported to be $6.3 million in February. However, unlike their other downtown properties, K&D indicated that it will remain an office building and not be converted to apartments any time in the near future. In March, it was announced that K&D did in fact purchase the building, but for only $5.2 million instead of $6.3 million as reported in February 2015.

== Legacy in community ==
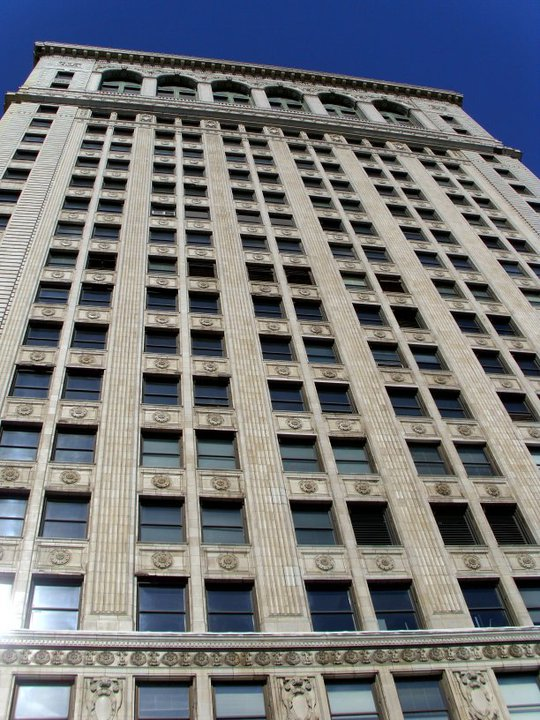

In 2010, the Keith Building is credited with being one of the biggest donors in Cleveland Thermal's Cleveland Food Bank annual Harvest for Hunger food drive. The Palace Theater is known for presenting children's entertainment for school children in the Greater Cleveland area and for many of these children it is their first taste of professional theater.

== See also ==
- List of tallest buildings in Cleveland
