= ArtCrimes =

Former Cleveland publication

- Editor: S. Judson Wilcox; Jim Lang; Ben Gulyas; Kathy Shumay; Kathy Ireland Smith; Chris Franke; Beth Wolfe; Melissa Jay Craig; Daniel Thompson
- Categories: underground art
- Frequency: annual (varied)
- Circulation: 200-300
- Publisher: Steven B. Smith
- First issue: 1986
- Final issue: 2006
- Country: United States of America
- Language: English

ArtCrimes was a Cleveland cult underground publication published by Steven B. Smith. The zine was influenced by the beats, and was consistent with the style of publications from the days of Kerouac, Corso, and Ginsberg.

Contributors included everyone from Bukowski and Micheline to people's pets. Ohio poets and artists included the likes of Daniel Thompson, Maj Ragain, Amy Bracken Sparks, Ben Gulyas, Chris Franke, Harvey Pekar, Gary Dumm, Masumi Hayashi and Ken Nevadomi. One reviewer postulated that ArtCrimes was the most significant publication of the Cleveland underground art scene in recent history.

== History ==
Before making visual art, Smith crafted unique journals into which he'd juxtapose images and poetry and journal entries. He used his art and poetry to make political statements.

In the mid-1980s, Smith decided to create ArtCrimes, a publication full of images and poems which also shared his disrespect for authority. ArtCrimes took on the spirit of Smith's journals, like a sketchbook that's been passed around to dozens of different artists.

The first issue, "If Indication Abnormal" was published in 1986. Guest editors S. Judson Wilcox, Jim Lang, Ben Gulyas, Kathy Shumay, Kathy Ireland Smith, Chris Franke, Beth Wolfe, Melissa Jay Craig, and Daniel Thompson had total latitude on subsequent issues. Formats included a coloring book, a popcorn box, a video, a deck of cards, legal tablets, and a catalog for the 1989 Performance Art Festival.

Poet Daniel Thompson (d. 2004) and Smith co-edited "Crimes in the Dark: Reel-Life Art," also known as the "popcorn box" edition of ArtCrimes. It contained coupons for events, in addition to the usual melange of poetry and images. A civil rights activist and advocate for the homeless, Thompson became the first honored "Poet Laureate" for Cuyahoga County, Ohio. Thompson is also known for Junkstock, a poetry, art and music festival from the 1980s. The highly acclaimed festival was held in a junk yard on Pearl Road in Cleveland.

The 2002 issue — co-edited with Beth Wolfe — was dedicated to Wayne Draznin, a professor at the Cleveland Institute of Art who died the previous year. Draznin was fond of rebellious socially-minded art.

Smith published the final issue of ArtCrimes in 2006.

Smith's work as a computer programmer financed ArtCrimes and his art. Production runs were small — a few hundred or so — and usually given away to artists and friends.
