= William Taylor & Son =

Six Six Eight
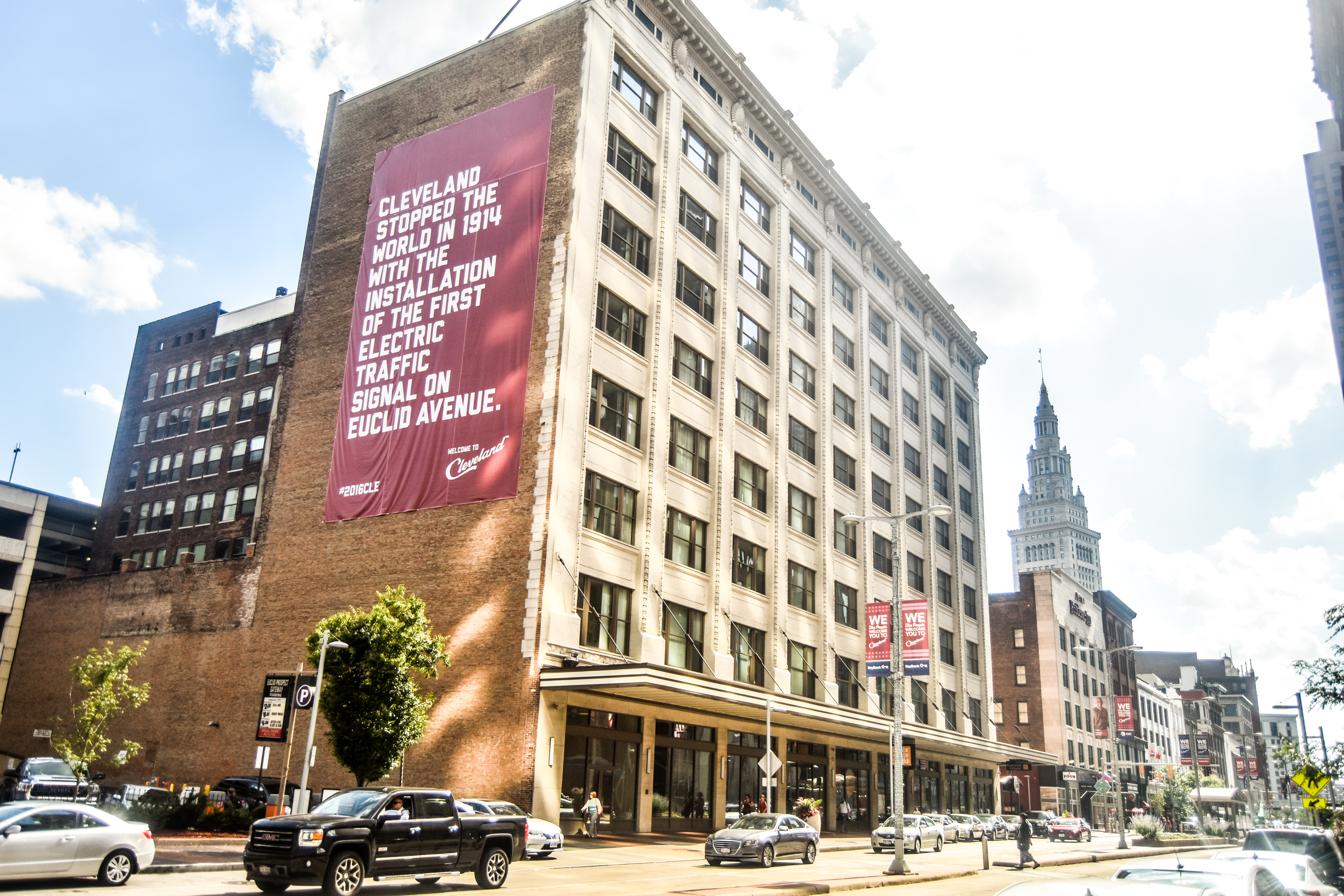
- Interactive map of the Six Six Eight area
- Former names: William Taylor & Son Company

General information
- Type: Residential
- Location: 668 Euclid Avenue, Cleveland, Ohio 44115, United States
- Coordinates: 41°29′58.85″N 81°41′18.45″W
- Construction started: 1907
- Completed: 1913
- Owner: K & D Group

Height
- Roof: 44.50 m (146 ft)

Technical details
- Floor count: 9

Design and construction
- Architect: J. Milton Dyer

The William Taylor & Son Company building is a 146-foot, 9-story, 1915-opened high rise apartment building in downtown Cleveland's Gateway District that had a long and fruitful former life as a major Cleveland department store. The building was originally only five floors, but when the company outgrew that floor plan, four more floors were added in 1913. The architect on the building was J. Milton Dyer who was also responsible for the Cleveland City Hall and CAC Building.

== Taylor's ==
Founded as Taylor, Kilpatrick, and Company in 1870, Taylor's was part of the big six department stores (Halle's, May's, Higbee's, Sterling-Lindner Davis, Bailey's, and Taylor's) in Cleveland. All six are now distant memories in Cleveland history. Taylor's was closely compared with Harrods and Selfridges in London in regards to its elaborate styling of architecture and the fact that it kept much British merchandise in stock. On October 24, 1941, Taylor's celebrated their flagship store's 26th birthday at the now demolished Hollenden Hotel, where the Fifth Third Center now stands on Superior and East 6th Street.

Taylor's (the store) had throughout its history gone through a succession of Taylors who operated and owned the store. This started with William Taylor (1832-1887) and his son John Livingstone Taylor (d.1892) who joined the firm in 1887, then when John died in 1892, the business went to Sophia Strong Taylor who managed and was president of the store until 1935, when she handed the reins over to her brother Charles H. Strong who was president until 1939, when it changed hands again to a man who was sympathetic to the minority owner of Taylor's, the May Company.

Eventually the department store catered to lower-middle-class patrons which fit in well with May Company's model to expand their clientele to include this often neglected demographic. In fact, in 1945, May completed a $2 million expansion of the store and began to invest heavily in the company. However, by 1961, not even twenty years later, it was closed.

== 668 Euclid ==
The second life of the building was commenced in 2009, when the K & D Group of Willoughby began offering apartments at the building, which was now called Six Six Eight Euclid Avenue. For this project, the old store was completely gutted and refaced, redecorated, and refinished to offer all the modern amenities that one expects in modern downtown urban dwelling. These renovations included granite countertops, stainless steel appliances, and custom floor treatments. This trend of rehabbing old buildings in Cleveland has gentrified and modernized buildings that were for so many years mothballed and left to rot. The interest in urban living and urban environs can be exemplified by projects like the 668, The 9 Cleveland, the Huntington Bank Building, 1717 East Ninth Building, the Statler Arms Apartments and the whole East 4th transformation of once abandoned properties.

iHeartMedia announced an agreement on March 21, 2021, to relocate the studios for their Cleveland radio stations to Six Six Eight, signing a 10-year lease with K & D Group. The new facilities would be among the first in the entire chain to operate solely from cloud storage technology, along with studios for podcast production and a street-level "marquee studio". All nine stations completed their relocation to Six Six Eight in July 2022.
