= Halle Building =

- U.S. National Register of Historic Places
- U.S. Historic district – Contributing property
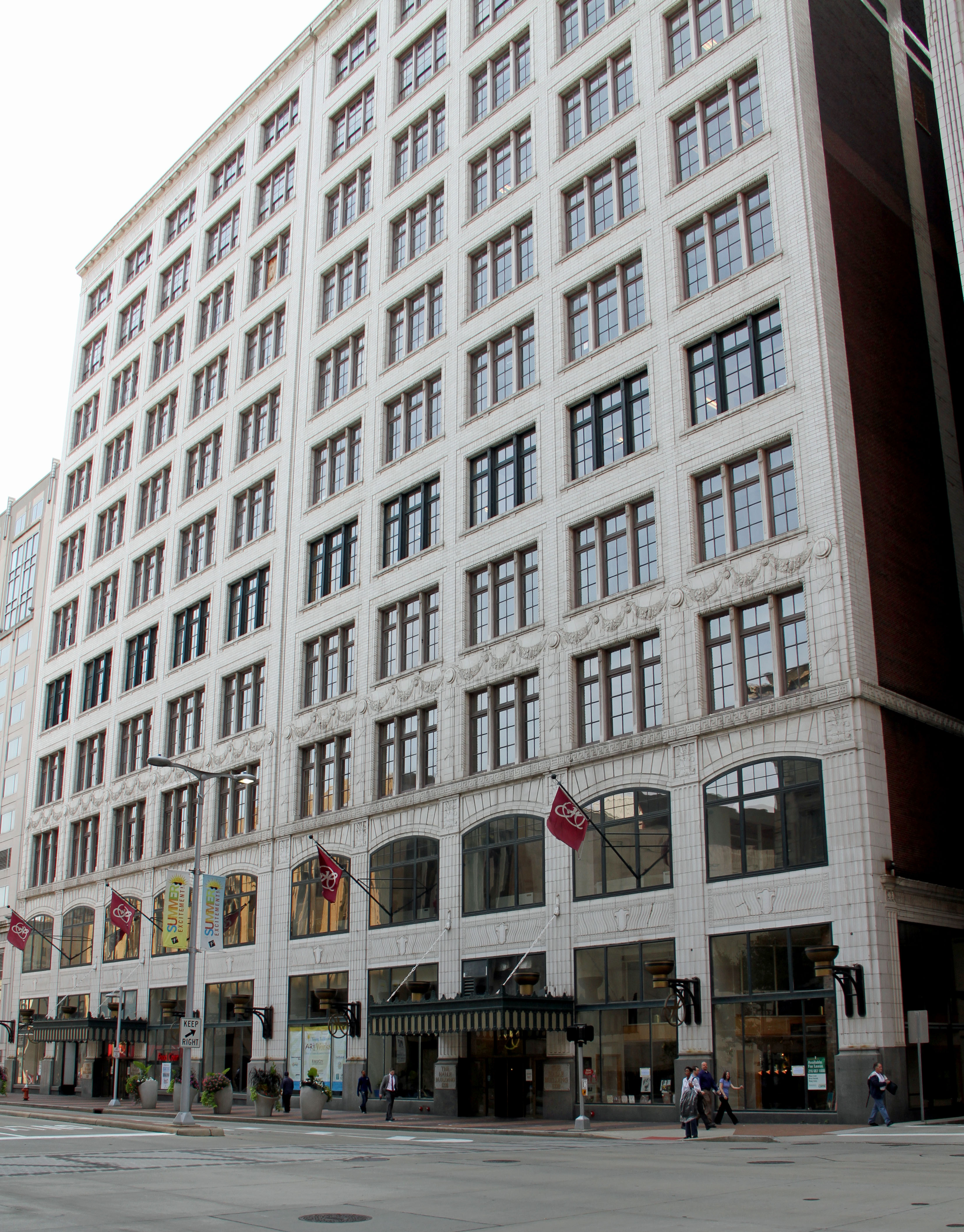

- Location within Cleveland Location within Ohio Location within the United States
- Location: 1228 Euclid Avenue, Cleveland, Ohio, U.S.
- Coordinates: 41°30′01.3″N 81°41′01.9″W
- Built: 1910 (original building); 1914 (first addition); 1949 (second addition)
- Architects: Henry Bacon (1910 and 1914 buildings); Walker & Weeks (second addition)
- Architectural style: Chicago School
- Website: www.residencesathalle.com
- Part of: Lower Prospect—Huron Historic District (ID94000640)
- NRHP reference No.: 83001953

Significant dates
- Added to NRHP: September 8, 1983
- Designated NRHP: September 8, 1983
- Designated CP: November 19, 1995

The Halle Building, formerly known as the Pope Building and after 2014 as The Residences at Halle, is an 11-story Chicago School mixed-use structure located in the Downtown Cleveland central business district in Cleveland, Ohio, in the United States. Designed by architect Henry Bacon, the building was the flagship department store of the Halle Brothers Co. from 1910 to 1982.

The Halle Building was added to the National Register of Historic Places on September 8, 1983, and converted to office space in 1986. On November 19, 1995, the Halle Building was listed as a contributing property to the Lower Prospect—Huron Historic District. The Halle Building was purchased by K & D Group in 2014. The ground floor was converted back to retail, and the sixth through tenth floors turned into apartments.

== The Pope Building ==
In 1900, the site of the original (1910) and the addition (1914) Halle buildings was occupied by mostly by single-story wood-frame houses. On the east side of the intersection of E. 12th Place (also known as "Short Alley") and Euclid Avenue were two low-rise, mixed-used buildings, 1208 Euclid and 1218 Euclid. Built between 1874 and 1881, they contained retail and offices on the first few floors and residential housing above. 1111 Huron Road, another office building located slightly southeast of (but on the same lot as) 1218 Euclid, was built about the same time. There were also several large structures on or adjacent to the site. The earliest of these was the Cleveland Wheel Club, finished in 1893 and located on the east side of the intersection of E. 12th Place and Huron Road. It was later known as the Wyandot House hotel. The next major structure was the Euclid Point Building (also known more simply as the "Point Building"), which began construction in 1907 at the intersection of Huron Road and Euclid Avenue (1260 Euclid Avenue). The large property between the Euclid Point Building and the future site of the Halle Building was leased in 1909, and became the Winous Building. (Note: These two structures eventually merged into a single building, which continued to be known as the Point Building.) The Cleveland lodge of the Benevolent and Protective Order of Elks began construction of a 4 1/2-story office-and-retail structure at 1041 Huron Road in 1909. The structure was finished in March 1911.

=== Planning ===
In 1905, former Cleveland resident Alfred Atmore Pope and one of his business associates, Harrison Whittemore, purchased the site of the Halle Building and began planning the construction of a 16-story office building on the eastern portion of the site (adjacent to the Point Building). Pope took the lead in overseeing the project, hiring New York City architect Henry Bacon to design the structure. By June 1907, plans for the building were largely complete. It was reduced to just 10 stories and had a 100-foot (30 m) frontage on both Euclid Avenue and Huron Road, giving the structure an average depth of 150 feet (46 m). The skin of the building was brick facade clad in glazed terracotta. Bacon designed a structure with three below-ground levels. In addition to the basement, there were two sub-basements, the lowest of which was intended to be used as a station for a then-planned Cleveland subway.

The existing structures between 1218 Euclid/1111 Huron and the Point Building were demolished, Cleveland-area builders traveled to New York City consult with Pope and Bacon, and test drillings were conducted at the site to determine the quality of the underlying soil and rock.

=== Quicksand solution ===
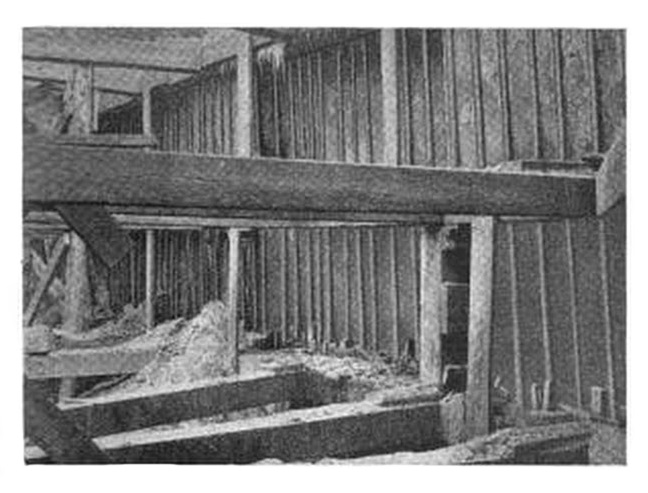
Sheet steel piling in place along Huron Road

Tidewater Construction, a New York firm, began excavation toward the end of June 1907. Quicksand was soon discovered. The geology of the site consisted of 16 feet (4.9 m) of soil, 4 feet (1.2 m) of watery sand, 27 feet (8.2 m) of quicksand, and then a very deep vein of hard, blue clay. The surprising discovery of quicksand (Note: None of the test drillings had found any quicksand.) required extensive soil engineering by superintendent of design L.J. Lincoln (Bacon's chief assistant) and structural engineer F.A. Burdette. Their solution was to redesign the foundation so the building could "float" on the bed of quicksand.

The T.B. Bryson company of New York City was the general contractor for the cofferdam. To create the cofferdam, Bryson excavated to the watery sand. About 600 steel sheets, manufactured by Carnegie Steel and each 35 feet (11 m) long and 12 inches (30 cm) wide, were then driven completely into ground. This left the sheets embedded in about 4 feet (1.2 m) of the blue clay. Sheet-driving was subcontracted to the Great Lakes Dredge & Dock Co. Each steel sheet dovetailed with the one next to it, and soft pine splines inserted into the dovetails. The wood swelled when it came into contact with water, helping to ensure a tight seal.

Sheet-driving began in the middle of the west side, and worked counter-clockwise. Because 1218 Euclid had a very shallow foundation, a two-story concrete wall had to be erected to support building while excavation occurred. A drop hammer rather than a steam hammer was used on the east side as well, as sheet-driving occurred within 8 inches (20 cm) of the adjacent structure's wall. Once the sheet-driving reached the east side, work began in the middle of the west side and worked clockwise around the site. Special care needed to be taken on the Euclid Avenue side of the building due to the danger of cave-ins. The work met at the northeast corner of the site.

The Bryson company then drove large, round wooden piles through the quicksand and into the clay below. The interior of the cofferdam was excavated, and timber braces (each 12 by 12 inches (30 by 30 cm) in thickness and 8 feet (2.4 m) long) were placed 4 to 6 feet (1.2 to 1.8 m) apart to help stabilize the sheeting until the foundation and interior walls could be constructed.

=== Foundation ===
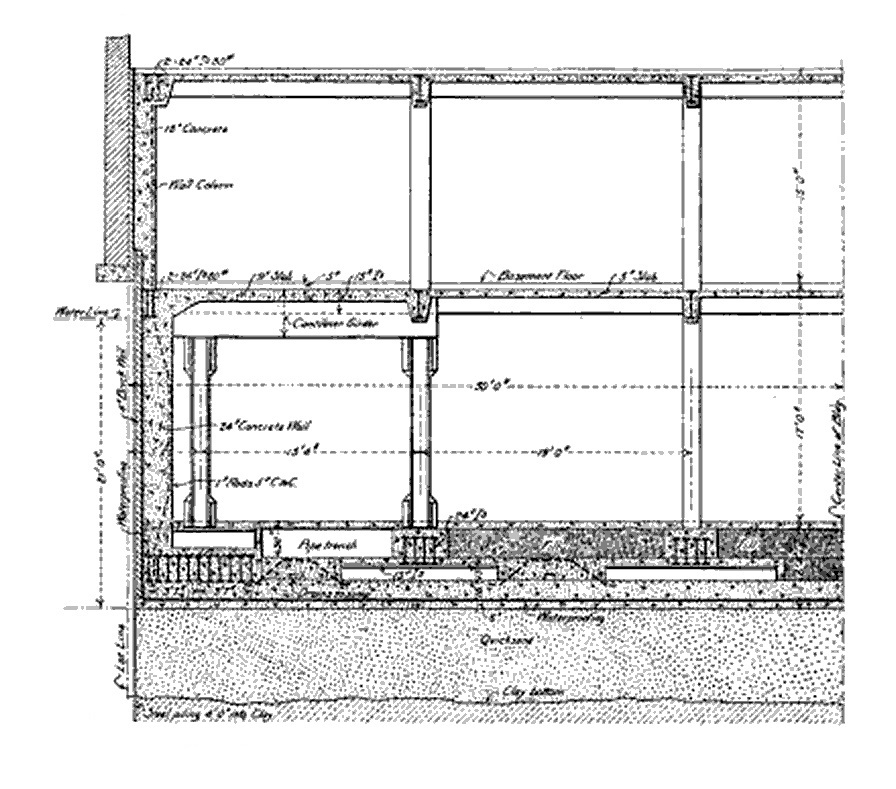
A complex system of grillage, cantilevers, offset wall columns, and supports was needed for the foundation of the Pope Building

The foundation of the Pope Building is a combination of reinforced concrete floating raft and grillage. Reengineering the foundation due to the quicksand problem meant only a single sub-basement was constructed.

In the sub-basement, the sheet piling was plastered and then waterproofed with felt and tar. The felt/tar waterproofing was flashed over the top of the sheet piling and extended horizontally about 1 foot (0.30 m) past the outer wall. Below the sub-basement floor was another waterproofing layer that consisted of 6 inches (15 cm) of reinforced concrete (Note: All of the concrete used in the building contained aggregate made of crushed slag from local iron and steel mills.) poured atop the watery sand and then topped with felt and tar. The sub-basement walls were built directly against the waterproofed sheet piling, and made of concrete 3 feet (0.91 m) thick. The upper part of the sub-basement walls were reinforced with rebar 1 inch (2.5 cm) thick and 6 inches (15 cm) apart.

Grillages to hold the columns in place were placed atop the waterproof layer. Each grillage consisted of two tiers of interlocking 24-inch (61 cm) I-beams. Each grill supported a single one of the 40 columns that made up the building's superstructure. The floor of the sub-basement was poured atop the waterproofing layer, and made of reinforced concrete. Originally, the building was to have relied on the sheet piling and sub-basement wall columns to support the outer walls. Structural engineers, however, felt that the re-engineered steel sheet pilings would give way under the centripetal forces placed on it by the quicksand as well as the building's weight. (Note: The structural engineers proved correct. The steel sheet piling displaced inward by 4 to 33 inches (10 to 84 cm).) This required them to alter their plan for the wall columns that supported the building's frame and upper floors. The new foundation's wall columns (now called "fulcrums") were set inward 5 feet 2 inches (1.57 m) from the sub-basement wall. Each fulcrum consisted of two C-beams, each 15 inches (38 cm) wide and held together by four 18 inches (46 cm) cover plates. A girder, made of steel plates bolted together and 21.4 inches (54 cm) long, 18 inches (46 cm) wide, and 50 inches (130 cm) deep, acted as a cantilever. One end was anchored atop the fulcrum, while the other end was supported by a "cantilever support column" (almost identical to the fulcrum) set 12.5 inches (32 cm) from the sub-basement wall. There were no steel wall columns against the outside walls of the basement or above-ground floors. Rather, a cup-like seat surrounded the inward end of the cantilever beam and the top of the fulcrum. Into this was seated the load-bearing column above (which, like those in the sub-basement, were set inward 5 feet 2 inches (1.57 m) from the exterior wall). The downward pressure of the load-bearing column helped to keep the cantilever in place atop the fulcrum, which in turn acted like a lever to support the exterior walls of the basement and upper floors.

Between the grills, 16 inches (41 cm) of reinforced concrete helped to spread the load and keep the grills in place. The concrete between the grillage and for the floor was poured as a single unit 5 to 6 feet (1.5 to 1.8 m) thick. A short girder was placed between the base of each near-wall column and the grillage surrounding the fulcrum to help the grillage and floor retain integrity. (Note: In two cases, the inward displacement of the steel sheet piling was greater than 6 inches (15 cm). To help reinforce the piling in these areas, the short girder was topped by four 24-inch (61 cm) long I-beams. These I-beams were long enough to extend over the top of the fulcrum grillage and across (but not past) the next load-bearing column's grillage. The load-bearing column put downward pressure on these I-beams. This created a second cantilever buried in the sub-basement floor, which helped to relieve pressure on the sheet piling.)

A 4-inch (10 cm) thick brick wall was built against the waterproofed sheet piling in the basement. Against this brick wall, a 2-foot (0.61 m) thick concrete wall was poured. The basement floor was made of reinforced concrete, and designed to support the weight of the building's steam heating plant, air conditioning plant, and other mechanical equipment. The load-bearing columns in the basement were all 17 feet (5.2 m) long.

The Pope Building had the deepest basement in Cleveland. (Note: The Rockefeller Building was the previous record-holder, with its lowest basement 35 feet (11 m) deep.) It was likely that this was the first time steel sheeting had been used as pilings in a large building anywhere in the United States, and local architects and The Plain Dealer newspaper called the soil engineering and foundation the most successful method of dealing with quicksand that the nation had ever seen.

The original basement and foundation design had an estimated cost of $175,000 ($6,300,000 in 2025 dollars). Under the revised plans, the cost of the cofferdam alone was estimated at between $150,000 and $200,000 ($5,200,000 to $6,900,000 in 2025 dollars), and that of the foundations $200,000 ($7,200,000 in 2025 dollars). The final total cost of both the cofferdam and the foundation was $500,000 ($17,300,000 in 2025 dollars).

Work began on the cofferdam on August 20, 1907, and took about two months to complete. About 40,000 cubic yards (31,000 m^{3}) of concrete and 1,600 short tons (1,500 t) of steel were used just for the foundation, which was finished about the end of 1907. As with nearly all foundations, the below-ground levels of the Pope Building were not intended to be completely watertight. The sub-basement was designed to collect water, which would then be pumped out into the city's sewer system. Because Cleveland's sewer lines were only 11 feet (3.4 m) below-ground, this meant that the water had to be pumped upward 31 feet (9.4 m) before it could enter the sewer line.

=== Completion of the original building ===
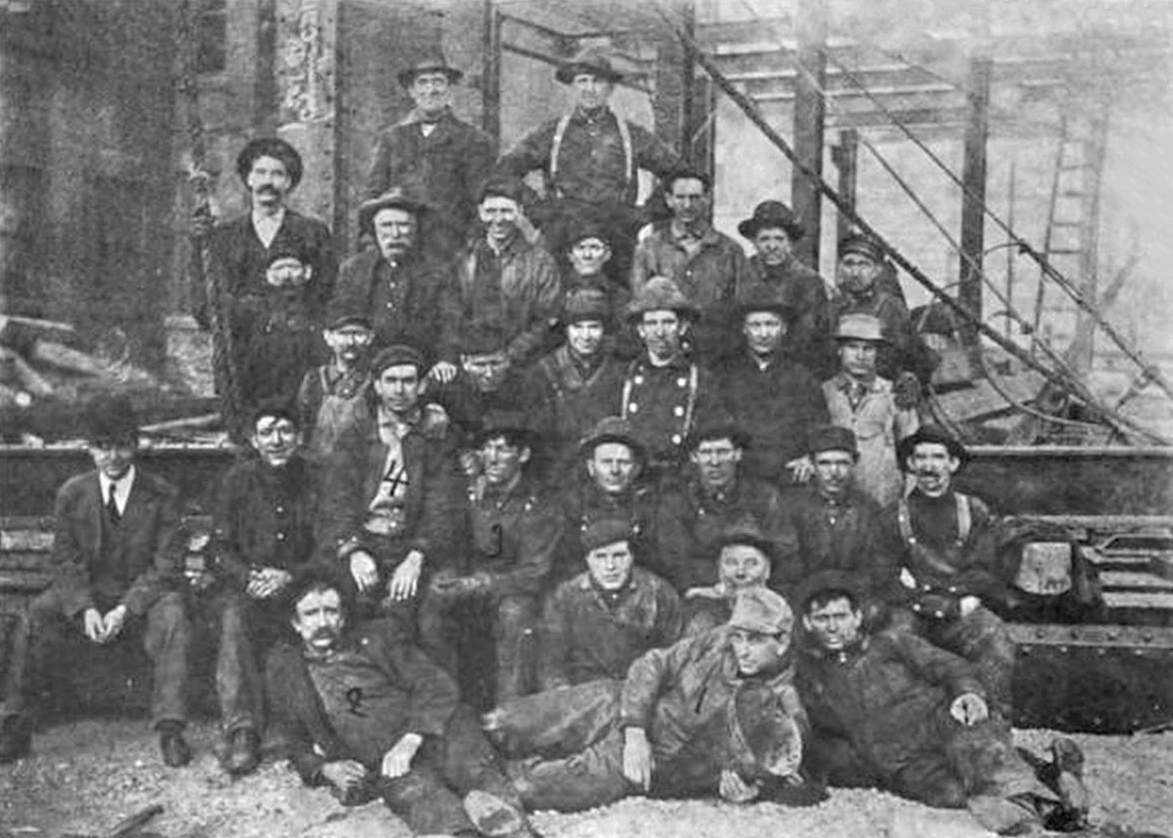
Members of Local 17 of the International Association of Bridge and Structural Iron Workers who erected the frame of the Pope Building

Tidewater Construction was awarded the contract to complete the building's superstructure. The 2,800 short tons (2,500 t) of steel for the edifice was provided by the Pittsburgh Steel Construction Co., and arrived in mid-September 1908. (Note: About 1,800 short tons (1,600 t) of steel were used in the frame alone.) The facade was made of brick faced with terracotta. The cream-colored, speckled, full-enamel terracotta was manufactured by the North Western Terra Cotta Company, and each tile was numbered so that workers knew exactly where it should go on the building's facade. The brick was made by the Cleveland Hydraulic Press Brick Company.

The exterior wall of the first floor was made of reinforced concrete 18 inches (46 cm) thick, waterproofed with a layer of felt, tar, and burlap. The rebar in the exterior wall was horizontal, carrying weight from column to column without putting too much pressure on the soil below. Above the first floor, two I-beams were attached to the exterior of the frame of the building. One carried the brickwork facade and the other carried the interior floor. The girders supporting floors two through ten were supported by rolled I-beams, with no more than 8 feet 8 inches (2.64 m) between each girder. The concrete enclosing the girders and the concrete for the floor were poured at the same time. The concrete enclosing the girders rose to a minimum of 3 inches (7.6 cm) above the girders, while the reinforced concrete for the floor itself was 5 inches (13 cm) thick.

On November 28, 1908, the Halle Bros. department store signed a long-term lease for the entire Pope Building. This allowed the company to move from its existing location at Euclid Avenue and E. 6th Street, and to double its space.

=== About the structure as originally built ===
The structure was routinely referred to as the Pope Building, even two years after Halle Bros. leased it.

As originally constructed, the Pope Building consisted of 10 floors, a basement, and a sub-basement. The building had a frontage of 100 feet (30 m) on both Euclid Avenue and Huron Road, was 165 feet (50 m) deep, and 210 feet (64 m) high at the roof line. Each floor had 14-foot (4.3 m) ceilings. With 140,000 square feet (13,000 m^{2}) of usable interior space, it was one of the largest retail structures in the Midwest.

Access to the building was provided by one freight and five passenger elevators. The interior of the public elevators were highly ornate. Each floor could also be reached by the public via marble stairways. Employees had their own utilitarian staircase, hidden from public view. Recently enacted city regulations required that the building include a fire escape. The Pope Building's fire escape was external to the structure proper and located on the Huron Road side. It was enclosed in its own bay, which projected outward from the building and had extensive windows to provide natural light.

A mechanical roofhouse contained the elevator machinery, a laundry, and a separate air circulation system serving the kitchen and bathrooms. Bert L. Baldwin & Co. of Cincinnati, Ohio, designed the electrical, heating, and ventilating systems. The Smith & Obey Co. of Cleveland installed the heating and ventilation. All the heating and ventilation equipment was located in the sub-basement. The heating system consisted of two Babcock & Wilcox steam boilers, Worthington steam pumps, and two separate heating delivery systems. The sub-basement, basement, and first floor were warmed via air heated in the sub-basement and then blown through ventilation ducts. This system also provided forced (but not cooled) air when heating was not needed. The second through tenth floors relied on a "Paul" dual high- and low-pressure steam system built by the Automatic Heating Company and using steam radiators designed and built by the American Radiator Company. The ventilation system was designed and built by the Donaldson Company. This system both dehumidified and filtered the air. A 40,000-cubic-foot (1,100 m^{3}) system provided air to the sub-basement and basement, while a separate 30,000-cubic-foot (850 m^{3}) system provided air to the first floor. A central spine in the building contained the electrical system, fresh water plumbing, and central vacuum system.

All the public floors were covered with hardwood, while the walls above featured Circassian walnut wainscoting and marble paneling. Most counters, chairs, and other interior fixtures were of mahogany. The lobbies on Euclid Avenue and Huron Road drew special attention from the press, which noted their solid bronze doors and fixtures and the extensive use of verde antique, Italian white, and Italian green marble. (Note: The floor of the lobbies were originally hardwood, but this was changed to marble in 1914.)

The total cost of the Pope Building was slightly more than $1.5 million ($51,800,000 in 2025 dollars).

The Pope Building opened to the public on February 21, 1910. Thousands of people thronged the structure. Halle Bros. was open for business, but customers were permitted only to look at the store and browse items for sale for the first few days. The department store occupied the entire structure. Bargains were sold in the basement. The first floor contained the glove, jewelry, and men's accessories departments, with bedding, fabric, sewing goods, and shoes sold on the second floor. Women's lingerie and underwear, European gowns, and baby and infant needs were sold on the third floor, while clothing for young and teenage girls as well as hats were sold on the fourth. The fourth floor also contained the public restrooms and a parlor where customers could make telephone calls. Home furnishings such as curtains and drapes, upholstery for furniture, and rugs were sold on the sixth floor. The entire seventh floor was given over to a restaurant. Two-thirds of this space was a lunch room which featured ivory-tinted walls. The remainder was a tea room which was paneled in English Oak. The eighth floor housed the offices of Halle Bros. (with executive suites facing Euclid Avenue). Employees had access to a lounge, dressing area, and showers on this floor. Much of the tenth (top) floor was lit via rooftop skylights, and was where the fine furs and tailoring departments were located. (Note: The first below-ground level had originally been intended for use as a restaurant and for storage purposes. Only the first and second floor had been intended for use by a department store; the third through tenth floors were originally planned to be office space.)

The Pope Building sparked a major revitalization of the shopping district on upper Euclid Avenue. With the Swetland Building (1910) at 1010 Euclid and the Cleveland Athletic Club building (1911) at 1118 Euclid, the Pope Building helped create an almost unbroken city block of buildings with deep foundations.

== 1914 addition ==
=== Planning and construction ===
In 1912, Alfred A. Pope agreed to build an addition to the original building for Halle Bros. The 10-story addition was directly west of the first structure, with a 100 feet (30 m) frontage on both Euclid Avenue and Huron Road and an east–west average depth of 175 feet (53 m). The west wall of the original structure was modified so that the two buildings would become one. Henry Bacon designed the addition, as he had designed the original structure.

The addition was almost a copy of the original building. It had a steel frame and floors of reinforced concrete, and a brick façade covered in cream terracotta. One major change provided for extensive rooftop structures, set back from the edge and enclosed by a parapet, for employee use. A new, grand colonnade was also planned for the E. 12th Place side of the addition on the ground floor. Behind the colonnade, a row of small shops and stores were planned. E. 12th Place was one of Cleveland's narrowest streets, and only 30 feet (9.1 m) wide. Its sidewalks were so narrow, people could walk on them only in single file. The city gave permission for the addition to encroach on part of the street. At its north and south ends, the new colonnade was 19 feet (5.8 m) wide, but only 8 feet (2.4 m) wide in its middle. E. 12th Place was closed to vehicular traffic to accommodate the colonnade. A third major entrance to Halle Bros. was planned for E. 12th Place as well, with a grand staircase leading up to the second floor and down to the basement.

Tidewater Construction was given the construction contract. The estimated cost of the addition was $750,000 ($24,400,000 in 2025 dollars).

Construction on the addition began about August 1913. Tidewater Construction installed a temporary wooden colonnade on Euclid Avenue to protect people on sidewalk from falling construction debris. This type of safety measure had never before been seen in Cleveland, and it won high praise from the Cleveland Real Estate Board. The first serious construction accidents on either Pope building were recorded during construction of the addition. Iron worker Fred Horton, age 32, died after falling several stories from a steel beam into the basement on October 14. James O'Brien fell two stories into the basement on October 27, but he landed on a pile of sand (which saved his life). In early December 1913, Tidewater Construction agreed to recognize its various construction unions, and signed a contract with the Building and Construction Trades Department of the American Federation of Labor.

=== About the 1914 addition ===
The addition formally opened on November 2, 1914, increasing the size of the total available space to 425,000 square feet (39,500 m^{2}). The enlargement allowed Halle Bros. to offer a broader range of products, and for the first time the company began to sell candy, furniture, and men's clothing.

In addition to air filtration/tempering, heating, and ventilation, the sub-basement of the addition contained the elevator machinery and a pneumatic message system. A central spine in the building contained a spiral conveyor belt, the driving machinery for which was also in the sub-basement. With this system, merchandise could be moved from one floor to another where it could be retrieved by a staff person and given to a customer.

As in the original building, the basement was where bargains were sold. For the first time, Halle's had enough space to begin selling men's and boys' clothing. These departments were also located in basement, beneath the colonnade on the addition's west side.

The first floor of the addition sold men's accessories and gloves, sporting goods, and select children's toys. The west side of the addition's first floor consisted of several small, self-contained stores which the department store called "Men's Row". Each of these stores could be accessed via the colonnade, or from the interior of the building. The first floor vestibule was accessed from E. 12th Place, and the entire floor was covered in marble. Patrons could reach the second floor or the basement from the vestibule via a grand marble staircase or an elevator.

The second floor was actually a mezzanine, with each department located in its own small, enclosed shop. Departments on this floor included with bedding, fabric, sewing goods, shoes, fine jewelry, small imported porcelain items, and novelties. An information desk on the mezzanine level provided areas where customers could write notes or letters, a kiosk where individuals could purchase tickets to local concerts or plays, several public telephones, a kiosk for the dropping off and picking up of dry cleaning, and a post office.

Women's lingerie and underwear and baby and infant needs were sold on the third floor. A greatly expanded women's evening wear department, which included a stage surrounded by lighted mirrors (so customers could view themselves from all angles) existed on the fourth floor. A new department which sold specialized mourning wear, a children's barber, and a manicurist's parlor also occupied the fourth floor. Bedroom, dining room, living room, and library furniture and accessories were sold on the fifth floor, while home décor items and a home decorating service occupied the sixth.

Most of the seventh floor consisted of dining establishments. These included a new 75-seat men's lunchroom, furnished in an Italian style and serving grilled items; a tea room decorated in the American Colonial style; and a tea room in a Japanese style. Another children's toy department existed on the seventh floor as well, and adjacent to it was a playground (supervised by store staff) in which small children could play in a sandbox, in a child-size house, or on playground equipment. Adjacent to the playground was an enclosed, 50-foot (15 m) golf instruction green. Golfing lessons were given here, and golfing equipment sold nearby.

Halle Bros. offices occupied the eighth floor, reserve stock was located on the ninth floor, (Note: In addition to the reserve stock room, each floor of the addition also had its own stock room. Boys on roller skates brought stock from these storerooms to staff and patrons.) and the tenth floor held vaults where customers could store fine furs, rugs, and textiles. These vaults were cooled to between 25 and 30 °F (−4 and −1 °C), and accessed via a portal of sandstone carved in the Egyptian Revival style. A portion of the tenth floor also contained a tailor's department where alterations could be made.

The roofhouses had glass walls and ceilings, and contained a lunchroom, men's smoking room, and women's lounge—all for the exclusive use of employees.

== 1949 addition ==
About 1945, Halle Bros. purchased the Elks building at 1051 Huron Road as well as the former Wyandot House (now an office building) at 1103 Huron Road. The company planned a $10 million ($178,800,000 in 2025 dollars) expansion project that included a downtown service building, branches in several Cleveland suburbs, and a new addition to its flagship store in Cleveland. The noted local architectural firm of Walker & Weeks designed the addition.

Work on the downtown expansion did not begin until 1947, as World War II-era restrictions on new building and materials were lifted only gradually after hostilities ended. Demolition of the Elks building did not occur until February 1947.

The new addition was 12 stories high. Halle Bros. removed the roofhouse structures atop its existing two buildings, and constructed two new stories atop the 1910 and 1914 structures to make them the same height as the new wing. New elevators were installed in the 1910 and 1914 buildings during the construction, and the new 12th floors housed new air conditioning units. Escalators were also added to the 1910 and 1914 buildings at this time. The colonnade on E. 12th Place was demolished. The street was excavated, and a tunnel connecting the basement of the 1914 and 1949 buildings constructed there. When finished, E. 12th Place was reopened for one-way vehicular traffic. In addition to the tunnel, a bridge connected the 1914 and 1949 buildings at the third floor.

A.T. Knudsen, a local firm, began work on the cofferdam in April 1947. The Sam W. Emerson Co. of Cleveland was the general contractor. The superstructure and most of the internal construction was complete by October 1948. The basement and first floor opened in November 1948, and the third floor in December 1948. Every month thereafter, another floor opened.

The mezzanine (second floor) opened on July 27, 1949, marking the completion of the $5 million ($67,700,000 in 2025 dollars) West Wing addition. The West Wing had the same brick and cream terracotta façade as the other Halle buildings. Only the basement and first through seventh floors were open to the public, giving the department store an additional 100,000 square feet (9,300 m^{2}) of retail space. The main entrances of the West Wing were on Huron Road and E. 12th Place. Display windows were not a feature of the West Wing; instead, large windows allowed the public to look into the court of the building and observe customers and salespeople.

The eighth through 12th floors of the West Wing were reserved for employee use. The eighth, ninth, and 10th floors consisted of office space, a goods marking and receiving department, and the advertising and display departments. The 11th floor housed three classrooms where employees received training, the employee cafeteria, a kitchen, a bakery, and an ice cream manufacturing facility. (These latter three provided food to all three of the company's employee restaurants in downtown Cleveland.) The 11th floor also had a 15-room clinic, hospital, and dental center. This healthcare center, which was accredited by the American College of Surgeons, served customers who became ill while shopping at Halle's. Employees also received low-cost healthcare there as part of their benefits package. The 12th floor housed maintenance shops and the building's air conditioning equipment. The western portion of the 12th floor housed the Halle's employee lounge (with views of The Flats to the west). A staircase led from this lounge to the roof, where employees could enjoy a rooftop garden. Atop the roof was a 75,000 US gallons (280 kl) water tower. The second-highest water tower in the city at the time, it provided pressure for the fire control sprinkler system.

== Post-Halle's history of the building ==
=== Closure of Halle's ===
Halle Bros. occupied what now became known as the Halle Building until the early 1980s. The company was sold to Marshall Field's in 1970, and then to Associated Investors Corporation in November 1981. Associated Investors closed all the Halle's stores, including the downtown flagship store, in January 1982.

=== Conversion to offices ===
Forest City Enterprises took at 50 percent ownership in the building in June 1982. Six months later, Forest City and Jacob Schottenstein, majority owner of Associated Investors, formed a joint venture named S&R Playhouse Realty Co. to renovate the building. S&R Playhouse Realty sought to renovate floors two through 11 into 400,000 square feet (37,000 m^{2}) of office space, and to remodel the basement, first floor, and mezzanine into 50,000 square feet (4,600 m^{2}) of retail and restaurant space.

The Halle Building was added to the National Register of Historic Places on September 8, 1983.

S&R Playhouse Realty asked Cuyahoga County officials for $10 million ($32,300,000 in 2025 dollars) in industrial bond revenues to pay for the $27 million ($87,300,000 in 2025 dollars) in redevelopment costs it wanted to incur. S&R Playhouse Realty formed a subsidiary, Halle Office Building Limited Partnership, and assigned it a 50 percent interest in the office portion of the building. S&R Playhouse Realty sold the other half to outside investors. Forest City and Schottenstein put $8.4 million ($26,000,000 in 2025 dollars) of their own money into the project as well. The ultimate cost of the renovation was $31 million ($92,800,000 in 2025 dollars). The city of Cleveland gave a $7.1 million ($21,300,000 in 2025 dollars) federal Urban Development Action Grant (UDAG) loan and Cuyahoga County gave a $14 million ($41,900,000 in 2025 dollars) industrial development loan (funded by a bond issue) to S&R Playhouse Realty to assist in paying for the remodeling. (Note: The county also issued $3.5 million ($10,500,000 in 2025 dollars) in bonds to convert a Halle's warehouse at 1212 Huron Road into a parking garage.) The basement (now called a "concourse") became a 400-seat food court named Cabaret. Each office floor had 40,000 square feet (3,700 m^{2}) of space. The escalators were enclosed but not removed in case a client leased more than one floor. The 10th and 11th floors became a health club.

The city of Cleveland and other area landlords agreed to improve their properties at the same time as part of a broader attempt to improve the economic viability of the area around the Halle Building. In 1983, the eastern portion of the Point Building was demolished. Huron Road was redirected to turn north through this portion of the Point Building site, connecting it with E. 13th Street. A new mini-park and plaza was created on the old site of the road.

=== Hotel construction to the east ===
In the fall of 1987, local developers proposed demolishing the remainder of the Point Building and constructing a new luxury hotel on the site to serve the reviving Playhouse Square district to the east of the Halle Building. The Point Building was razed in the fall of 1988 to prepare for this construction. Demolition of the structure left the windowless, blank eastern wall of the Halle Building facing Playhouse Square.

The $27.6 million ($61,500,000 in 2025 dollars) Wyndham Hotel at Playhouse Square broke ground in July 1993, and opened on July 7, 1995.

On November 19, 1995, the Lower Prospect—Huron Historic District (of which the Halle Building is a contributing property) was added to the National Register of Historic Places.

=== Operational history of the office building ===
In March 1997, Forest City agreed to move its headquarters into downtown Cleveland's Terminal Tower and remain there for 15 years. In exchange, the city of Cleveland forgave half the 1985 UDAG which had been used to renovate the Halle Building. Forest City also said it would pay off the remaining balance of the UDAG by 1999 as part of the deal.

The Halle Building was just two-thirds occupied in 2004, and dramatically slowing business over the last several years meant that only eight restaurants remained in the Cabaret food court by 2006.

In 2006, New York City-based real estate investor Stuart Venner (doing business as "216 Jamaica Avenue LLC") purchased the land under the Halle Building from the land's owner, Realty Investment Corporation, for $845,000 ($1,300,000 in 2025 dollars). Venner discovered that the original 1910 lease (still in force as of 2006) contained a "gold clause" that permitted rent to rise with the price of gold. Halle Bros. and Forest City's rent had remained at $35,000 a year since 1912. When Venner invoked the gold clause, Forest City's rent for the land beneath the Halle Building rose to more than $1.4 million a year. Forest City's S&R Playhouse Realty subsidiary (which had been assigned the lease) sued to have the gold clause declared invalid, but in August 2008 the United States Court of Appeals for the Sixth Circuit upheld the gold clause in the lease.

== K&D Group ownership ==
=== Putting the building up for sale ===
In late 2012, Forest City announced it was putting the Halle Building on the market after an attempt to secure a large tenant collapsed. The company took a $30.2 million ($42,400,000 in 2025 dollars) loss on the building and reduced its value to $10.5 million ($14,700,000 in 2025 dollars).

Cuyahoga County began to seek a new location for its government operations, and Forest City submitted the Halle Building as a potential site in September 2012. Forest City offered to sell the structure "as is", but the county chose to build a headquarters instead. In October 2013, Forest City reiterated in filings with the U.S. Securities and Exchange Commission that it still intended to sell the building or redevelop it with a partner.

By the summer of 2014, the Halle Building was only 50 percent occupied.

=== K&D Group purchase ===
K & D Group of Willoughby, Ohio, purchased the Halle Building and the parking garage across the street on Huron Road for $20 million ($27,200,000 in 2025 dollars) on December 3, 2014. K&D Group hired Berardi+Partners, a Columbus-based architectural firm, to design the renovations. K&D said it would convert the upper floors into 240 apartments, refurbish two floors and retain them as office space, and add 80 basement parking spaces to the 600-space garage across Huron Road. The company initially said construction would begin in 2016, but just days later pushed the start of construction to 2018.

K&D Group applied for a state of Ohio historic preservation tax credit for 2015, but was not successful. The company applied again in 2016, and won a $5 million ($6,700,000 in 2025 dollars) credit. The credit was the maximum amount allowed. K&D Group now planned to add an atrium to the center of the building. The company changed its plans for residential housing at the Halle Building, now only converting the upper six floors to apartments. (It said there would be 125 apartments ranging in size from 900 to 3,000 square feet (84 to 279 m^{2}) in size.) About 200,000 square feet (19,000 m^{2}) of space on the lower floors was reserved for office tenants and retailers. K&D Group also won a federal historic preservation tax credit and $11.3 million ($15,200,000 in 2025 dollars) in federal New Markets Tax Credit Program loans to assist with the renovation.

K&D Group established two subsidiaries, both condominiums, to own the Halle Building. One was assigned the five-floor office/retail section and the other the five-floor residential portion. A particularly complex financing package fell into place in the late spring of 2017. Construction on the $60 million ($78,800,000 in 2025 dollars) Halle Building conversion began in June, with the office floors being renovated first so that upper-floor tenants could move down and free up space for the residential conversion. Cleveland Construction Inc. of Mentor, Ohio, was the general contractor.

== About The Residences at Halle ==
Floors six through 10 of the Halle Building are now known as The Residences at Halle. Floors six through nine contain 122 one-, two-, and three-bedroom units, while the 10th and 11th floors contain 12 larger, two-story "penthouse" luxury units. Units range in size from 865 to 1,535 square feet (80.4 to 142.6 m^{2}) on the sixth through ninth floors, and up to 3,070 square feet (285 m^{2}) in the penthouse apartments. Residents have access to a 17,000-square-foot (1,600 m^{2}) fitness center on a lower floor as well as parking in the Huron Road garage (accessible via a tunnel under Huron Road). (Note: The 12th floor still contains each building's mechanical equipment.)

Residential tenants began moving into The Residences at Halle in August 2018, with construction on all units scheduled for completion in January 2019.

== In popular culture ==
During the late 1990s, the Halle Building's facade was used as the location of the fictional Winfred-Louder store on The Drew Carey Show.

A portion of a fight scene between Spider-Man and Sandman was filmed in front of the Halle Building for the film Spider-Man 3 (2007).

== Bibliography ==
- "Heating and Ventilating the Alfred A. Pope Building, Cleveland, O." Engineering Review. June 1910. pp. 40–45.
- "Installation of United States Steel Sheet Piling, Pope Building, Cleveland". The Iron Trade Review. May 28, 1908. pp. 989–993.
- Jacoby, Henry Sylvester; Davis, Roland P. (1914). Foundations of Bridges and Buildings. New York: McGraw-Hill Book Company.
- "Structural Features of the Pope Building, Cleveland, Ohio". The Engineering Record. October 31, 1908. pp. 489–490.
