= Steven B. Smith (poet) =

American artist and poet

- Born: 1946 (age 79–80); Wallace, Idaho
- Occupations: Artist, Poet, Publisher

Steven B. Smith (born 1946 in Wallace, Idaho), is an underground artist and poet from Cleveland, Ohio. He published ArtCrimes, a zine influenced by the beats. Smith's art and poetry uses cultural themes as found objects with a Dadaist influence.

His life is pockmarked with colorful episodes such as stealing cars when he was thirteen, getting kicked out of the U.S. Naval Academy, armed robbery, and prison.

== Early years ==
Smith was born in Wallace, Idaho, to Pappy Smith and Florence E. "Mother Dwarf" Smith. He was raised in Paradise Prairie, twenty miles outside of Spokane, Washington. He stole thirteen cars when he was thirteen.

In 1968 Smith was one of thirteen middies ousted by the Naval Academy for smoking pot. He haggled a deal with the government upon discharge; they agreed to pay for his education. He went on to receive a bachelor's degree in English and philosophy with a 3.8 GPA from Loyola College in Maryland.

Smith married into an East Coast blue-blood family in 1969. In 1970, he was arrested for armed robbery. Smith lived in Baltimore and other cities before coming to Cleveland in 1977 in pursuit of another man's wife. She then divorced her husband and decided to marry someone other than Smith.

== Art ==
Smith's art assemblages started when one day, instead of painting a key on a canvas, he picked it up and pasted it onto the canvas.

Smith's art uses iconic baubles with the effect of cheapening and attacking cultural themes. The work has been characterized as "difficult and uncompromising," and "repellent and grotesque," with roots from the dadaist collages of Schwitters and Rauschenberg.

Materials used include rusted wire, shattered glass, obscene imagery, dead mice, the artificial leg of a dead drug dealer and sometimes other people's art. His work is washed in blue "corrosion," a mix of matte medium, copper powder, and salt. Another reviewer says Smith's use of oxidized copper makes his works appear to be fetched from the bottom of the sea.

Smith uses cultural themes as found objects. "I deal in symbolic juxtapositions of the odd and unwanted," Smith says. "My materials consist of cultural castoffs, sociological implications and the refuse known as suburban thought. My goals are simple; erase your labels; learn to look about ... Learn to see dead frog and rust and thus re-see yourself." He says, "My art is a collaboration with the pieces."

After the death of his brother Cat (Vincent Smith), Smith started exhibiting his brother's remains at his shows, leaving some of the ashes behind after each exhibit.

== Notoriety ==
Smith first gained notoriety with a piece — American Ego — in the People's Art Show at CSU. His piece was a four-by-three grid of Polaroid snapshots, nude photos of himself in compromising positions with the American flag. This piece won the "most outrageous" award at the show.

Next, three pieces of his art were censored from a show at Tri-C West. Smith agreed to the removal as long as a "censored" notice was put on the wall in place of the missing art. The opening night poetry reading was reassigned to a remote conference room. During the reading Smith discovered that Tri-C neglected to post the notes. He wrote "CENSORED" on the wall with a ball point pen. Poet Daniel Thompson decided to read in the original gallery, and mouthed the words to his poem silently as a Tri-C co-director sanded the words off the wall.

== Work ==
Smith worked longest as a computer programmer, which helped support ArtCrimes and his art. He frequently contracted with BP. Previous occupations include sailor, milk man, life insurance salesman, avant garde theater manager, newspaper film and music critic, woman's shoe salesmen, prison cook, carnival laborer, and church janitor. He's also worked at Bethlehem Steel.

Smith's "resume" was published in an article from 2000:

- 1950s
  - farm boy
  - cow milker
  - chicken/rabbit/hog waste remover
  - hod carrier
- 1960s
  - paper boy
  - car thief
  - electronics technician
  - poet
  - USNA midshipman
  - artist
  - husband
- 1970s
  - chemist
  - prison cook
  - bankrupt
  - avant-garde theatre manager
  - newspaper film/music critic
  - women's shoe salesman
  - adulterer
  - divorced

== Cleveland Warehouse District ==
Smith and his friend and frequent collaborator S. Judson Wilcox were two early "urban pioneers": artists who settled the Warehouse District in Cleveland in 1981. Artists, musicians and renegades moved there to revel in Cleveland's industrial beauty. The warehouse district was a haven.

Smith and Wilcox had an "Art Behind Bars" installation in the district with mannequins, Mickey Mouse, and neon tube calliope.

Smith's brother "Cat" moved into the warehouse with him. Cat Smith's collages were dead ringers for Schwitters'.

Smith and Cat's spot in the warehouse became a gathering spot for other artists in the building, and scene, including S. Judson Wilcox, Melissa Jay Craig (AKA "Field Marshal May Midwest"), Jeff Chiplis, Laszlo Gyorki, Ken Nevadomi, Randy Rigutto, Jay Clements, and Beth Wolfe. Guests were offered keepsakes of miniature toy soldiers, babies in plastic bubbles, or poetry.

SPACES Gallery was located on the first floor, making the warehouse the de facto epicenter of creative activity.

Cat was a troubled man who eventually committed suicide. After he died, Smith heard a beeping in his studio. He couldn't figure out where the beeping came from, and thought it was the soul of his dead brother. He then found a worn-out smoke detector at the bottom of a huge pile in his studio.

In another installation with Wilcox, Smith used a bag of his dead brother's ashes. He claimed to have a pact with Cat. The first to die would be included in an exhibition of the other's work. In one of the exhibitions at SPACES gallery, Smith put Cat's ashes on a pedestal. The bag was punctured by a friend and ashes spilled onto the pedestal and the floor.

== ArtCrimes ==
Before making visual art, Smith crafted unique journals into which he'd juxtapose images and poetry and journal entries. Smith wrote clever, punning poetry and read it all over town. (His poetry is described as "a stream-of-consciousness assault on reason and order" and "a cross between Dada and Jack Kerouac.") Smith used his art and poetry to make political statements, and he also participated in a couple legendary "regional art terrorist" raids in the Flats.

Starting in 1986, Smith published the Cleveland cult underground publication ArtCrimes, a zine full of images and poems which also shared his disrespect for authority. ArtCrimes took on the spirit of Smith's journals, like a sketchbook that's been passed around to dozens of different artists. The zine was influenced by the beats, and was consistent with the style of publications from the days of Kerouac, Corso, and Ginsberg.

Contributors included everyone from Bukowski and Micheline to people's pets. Ohio poets and artists included the likes of Daniel Thompson, Maj Ragain, Amy Bracken Sparks, Ben Gulyas, Chris Franke, Harvey Pekar, Gary Dumm, Masumi Hayashi and Ken Nevadomi. One reviewer postulated that ArtCrimes was the most significant publication of the Cleveland underground art scene in recent history.

== Tremont ==
The affordability of Cleveland neighborhoods periodically caused mass migrations of artists. In the 1980s, Smith was one of the urban pioneers to move into the Warehouse District. In '85, he was one of many artists who moved from the warehouses to Tremont, in the typical pattern where artists move into undesirable but inexpensive neighborhoods, fixing up old buildings in which to live and work.

Shortly after Smith's move to Tremont, Cat committed suicide. Pappy Smith died shortly after, and Mother Dwarf (Florence E. Smith) left Las Vegas to come to live with Smith. Mother Dwarf began her art career producing collages for ArtCrimes. Smith and his mother's life together became a mother-son artistic collaboration.

Smith nearly died in 1991 from alcohol, and has been sober since then. One notable drunken episode was after an art auction. He'd bid loudly on every piece offered. He took a walk home with Mother Dwarf. He passed a fence of barking dogs, and started to howl "in communion." He leaned up over the dogs and they bit his scalp. The next day, Smith asked Mother Dwarf why he was covered in blood. "You mean..." she said, "You don't remember the dogs?"

== Recent ==
In an interview in 2000, Smith claimed his voice was raspy "because I don't talk to anyone anymore." He'd become a recluse whose doormat said "Go Away." He said, "I had to learn silence. People only remember the old days when I shocked people with what I said or made or did. But there's a lot of beauty in the things I've done."

In 2005 Smith's life hit a series of highs and lows. His mother died, he fell in love, he retired, and then discovered he had throat cancer. He published the final issue of ArtCrimes in 2006.

Smith is a documentarian. His journals are not the only documentation of his life. He continues with his 2500-page website agentofchaos.com.

Smith married poet Lady K in 2006. They began their relationship shortly after the death of Mother Dwarf in 2005. In 2006 Smith and his wife sold their home, gave away all of their possessions, and moved to Europe. His most recent book, Where Never Was Already Is (published in 2018), includes several decades of his poetry as well as many black and white examples of his collage art.

== Books ==
- Where Never Was Already Is [poems and collage art]. Smith, Steven B. Crisis Chronicles Press, 2018
- Hip Cat Femur Whack Give a Doc a Bone [poetry]. Smith, Steven B. NightBallet Press, 2013.
- Stations of the Lost and Found [memoir]. Smith, Steven B. & Smith, Kathy V. The City Poetry Press, 2012.
- Unruly [poetry]. Smith, Steven B. Crisis Chronicles Press, 2011.
- Zen Over Zero: Selected Poems 1964-2008 [poems and collage art]. Smith, Steven B. The City Poetry Press, 2008.
