= Kay Halle =

American journalist, broadcaster and socialite

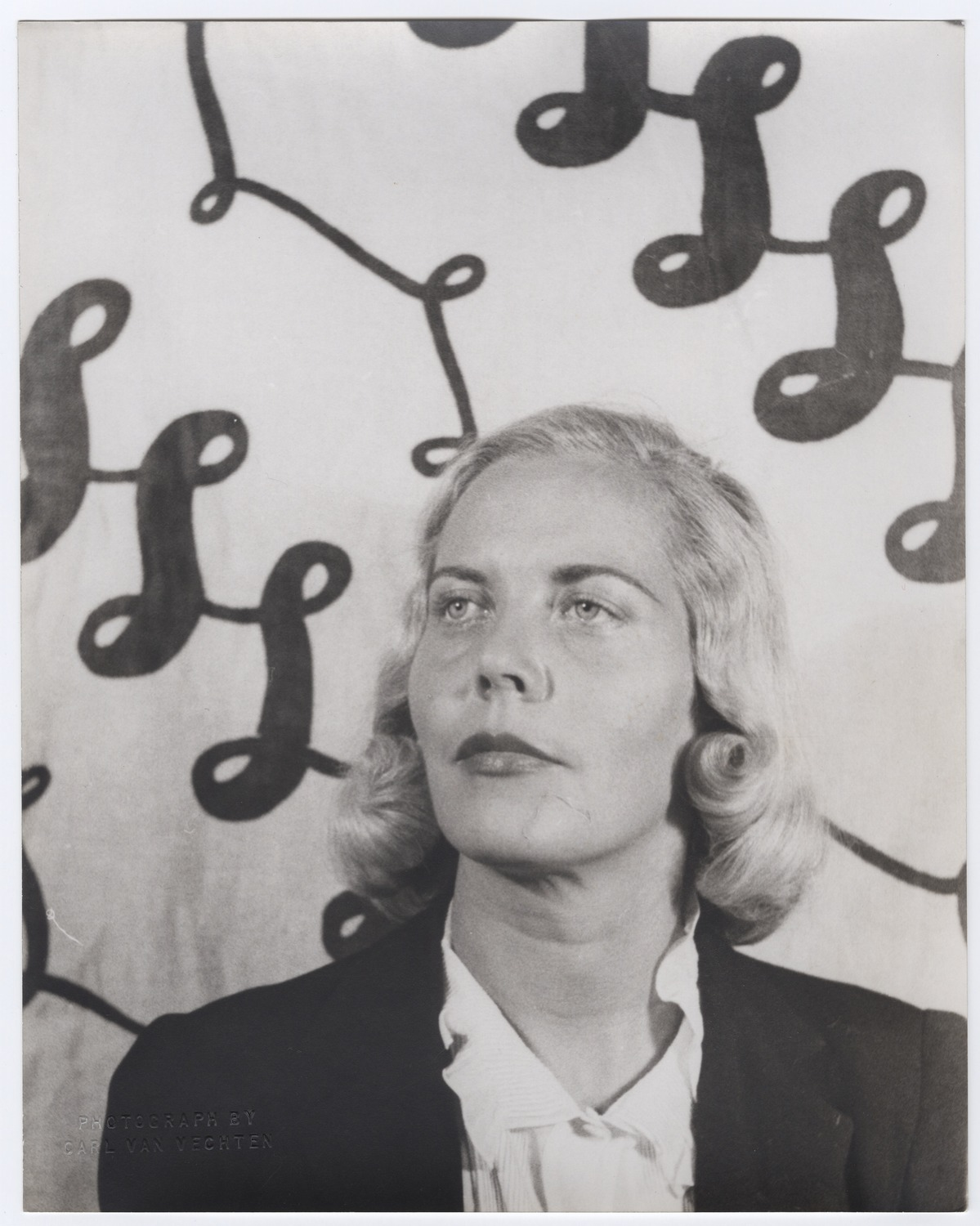
- Kay Halle (1938); Photo by Carl Van Vechten
- Born: Katherine Murphy Halle; October 13, 1903
- Died: August 7, 1997 (age 93)
- Occupations: Journalist; Author; Radio broadcaster
- Parent(s): Blanche Murphy Halle; Samuel Horatio Halle
- Family: Salmon Portland Chase Halle (uncle)

Katherine 'Kay' Murphy Halle (October 13, 1903 – August 7, 1997) was an American journalist, broadcaster and socialite.

She was born in Cleveland, Ohio, the daughter of Blanche (née Murphy) and Samuel Horatio Halle. Her father co-founded the Halle Brothers department store with his brother, Salmon Portland Chase Halle. Her mother was an Irish Catholic and her father Jewish. She attended Smith College and the Cleveland Institute of Music.

Halle was a department store heiress, World War II intelligence operative with the Office of Strategic Services, and intimate confidant and/or mistress of many luminaries of the 20th century, including George Gershwin, Randolph Churchill, W. Averell Harriman, Joseph P. Kennedy, Walter Lippmann, and Buckminster Fuller. She compiled and edited Irrepressible Churchill: A Treasury of Winston Churchill's Wit in 1966.
