= Cleveland News =

Major newspaper of Cleveland, Ohio (1905–1960)

- Type: Daily and Sunday
- Owner(s): Charles Augustus Otis, Jr. Daniel R. Hanna Sr. Forest City Publishing
- Founded: 1905
- Ceased publication: 1960
- Headquarters: Cleveland, Ohio, U.S.

The Cleveland News was a daily and Sunday American newspaper in Cleveland, Ohio. It was published from 1905 until 1960 when it was absorbed by the rival paper The Cleveland Press.

== History ==
The Cleveland News traces its antecedents to 1868, when The Cleveland Leader titled its late edition the Evening News. When a rival newspaper, the Cleveland Herald, ended publication in 1885, the Leader acquired rights to the name and retitled its evening edition the News & Herald.

In 1905, investment banker and businessman Charles Augustus Otis, Jr. — who the previous year had purchased the Cleveland World — bought both the News & Herald and the Evening Plain Dealer, and merged the trio into the single afternoon daily paper, the World-News, which debuted June 12, 1905. It became the Cleveland News on September 13, 1905.

Daniel R. Hanna Sr., who had bought the morning newspaper the Cleveland Leader in 1910, bought the Cleveland News from Otis two years later, and consolidated operations in the new Leader Building at East 6th Street and Superior Avenue. The Plain Dealer in turn bought the Cleveland Leader from Hanna in 1917, and the Sunday Leader became the Sunday News-Leader and later the Sunday News.

Hanna remained involved, and in an effort to compete with the more successful Cleveland Press after World War I, he hired Arthur B. "Mickey" McBride as circulation manager for the Sunday and daily Cleveland News, which in 1926 moved to a new publishing plant at East 18th Street and Superior Avenue.

After barely surviving the beginnings of the Great Depression, the News in 1932 was transferred by Hanna's heirs to the newly formed Forest City Publishing Company, which had also taken control of The Plain Dealer. Forest City ceased publishing the Sunday News on January 3, 1933, while continuing to publish the daily, staunchly Republican Cleveland News.

Forest City announced the sale of the News to the Scripps-Howard newspaper chain, owner of the Cleveland Press, on January 23, 1960. As Sterling E. Graham, president of Forest City, characterized his paper, "Ever since its beginning 55 years ago, the News' fate was to be a third newspaper." Its net circulation at the time was 134,550, compared with the Press' 314,000. The latter paper was renamed the Cleveland Press and News. The Plain Dealer moved into the former News headquarters.
