= Warehouse District, Cleveland =

Historic district in Ohio, United States

- Cleveland Warehouse District
- U.S. National Register of Historic Places
- U.S. Historic district

- Location within Cleveland Location within Ohio Location within the United States
- Location: Cleveland, Ohio
- Coordinates: 41°29′51″N 81°42′6″W
- Built: 1850
- Architectural style: Early Commercial, Italianate
- NRHP reference No.: 82003558 (original); 07000070 (increase)

Significant dates
- Added to NRHP: September 30, 1982
- Boundary increase: February 21, 2007

The Warehouse District is a nationally recognized historic district located in downtown Cleveland, Ohio. It is roughly bound by Front Avenue, Superior Avenue, West 3rd Street, and West 10th Street.

On September 30, 1982, it was added to the National Register of Historic Places as the Cleveland Warehouse District. On February 21, 2007, its boundary was increased to include 1384 to 1410 West 10th Street.

== History ==
In the first half of the 19th century, this neighborhood was part of Cleveland's original residential area. Later in the century, it became the center of Cleveland's wholesale commercial area, and was occupied by warehousing and distribution terminals for more than 100 years. But after warehouse traffic moved elsewhere, it fell into serious disrepair with empty, run-down warehouses. The area is historically anchored by major skyscrapers that echo Cleveland's industrial past, most notably the Rockefeller Building.

In the late 1970s, the Warehouse District underwent major renovation and revitalizing, with the buildings being repurposed as bars, restaurants, shops, nightclubs, and apartments for people seeking to live downtown, and eventually became a nightlife hotspot for 20-somethings and urban professionals, following a pattern pioneered in Cleveland by the Flats entertainment district, which it ultimately supplanted as the city's premier weekend place-to-be.

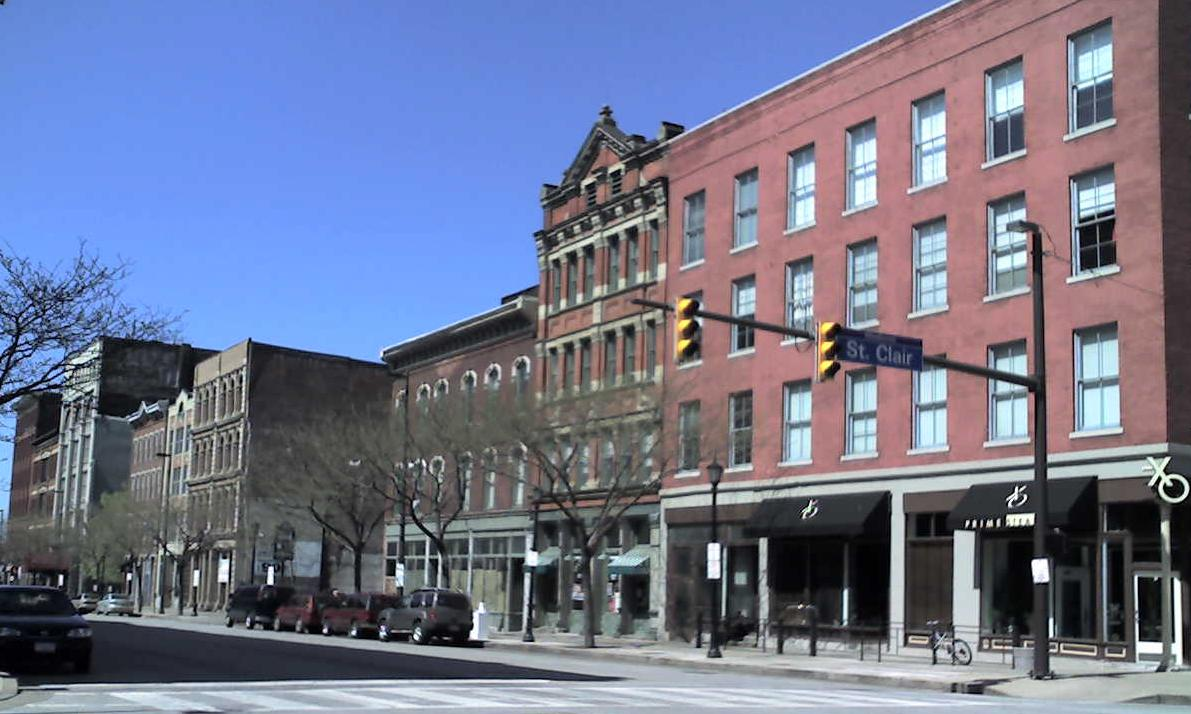
Historic Warehouse District - West Sixth Street

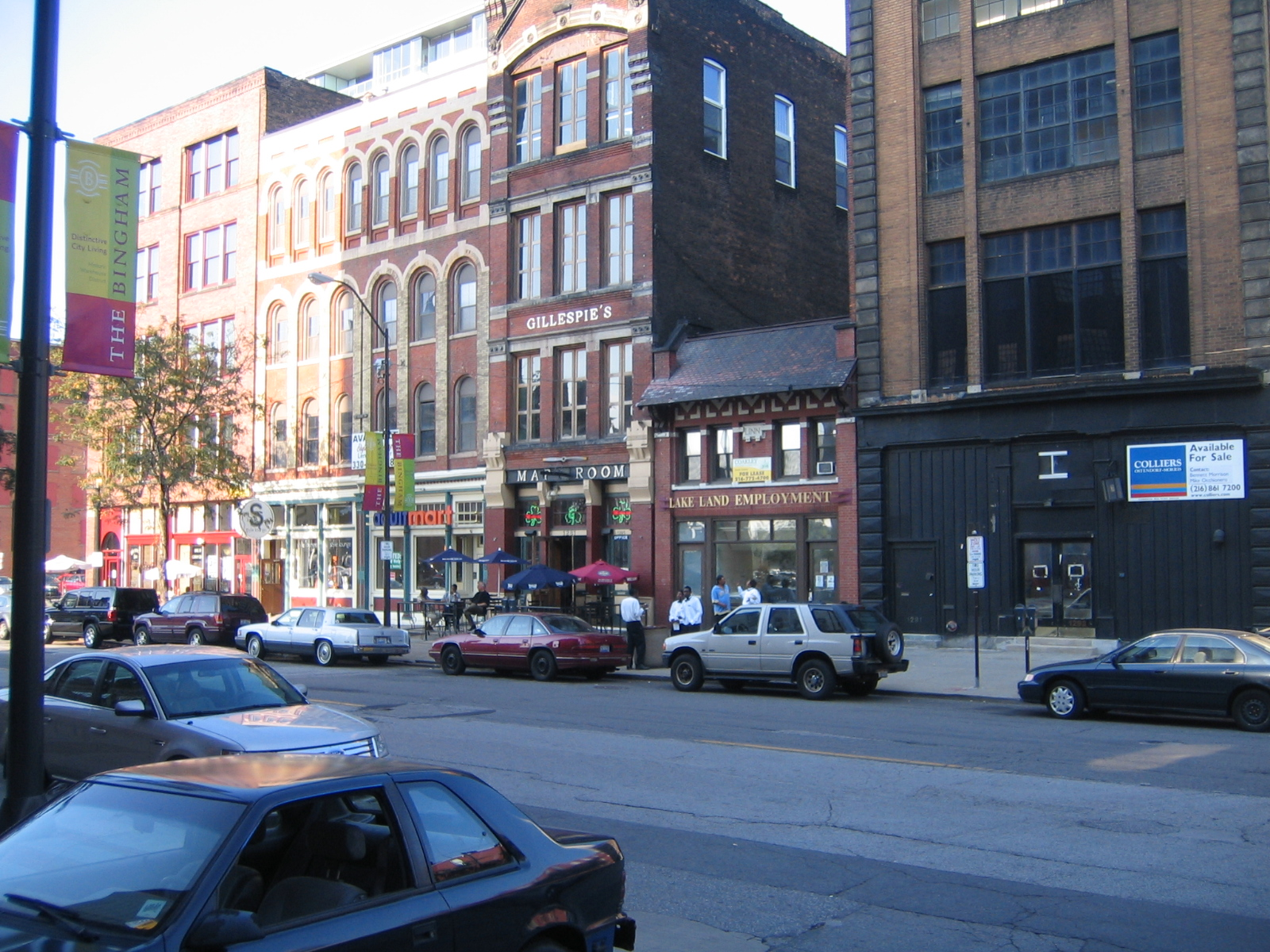
Historic Warehouse District - West Ninth Street

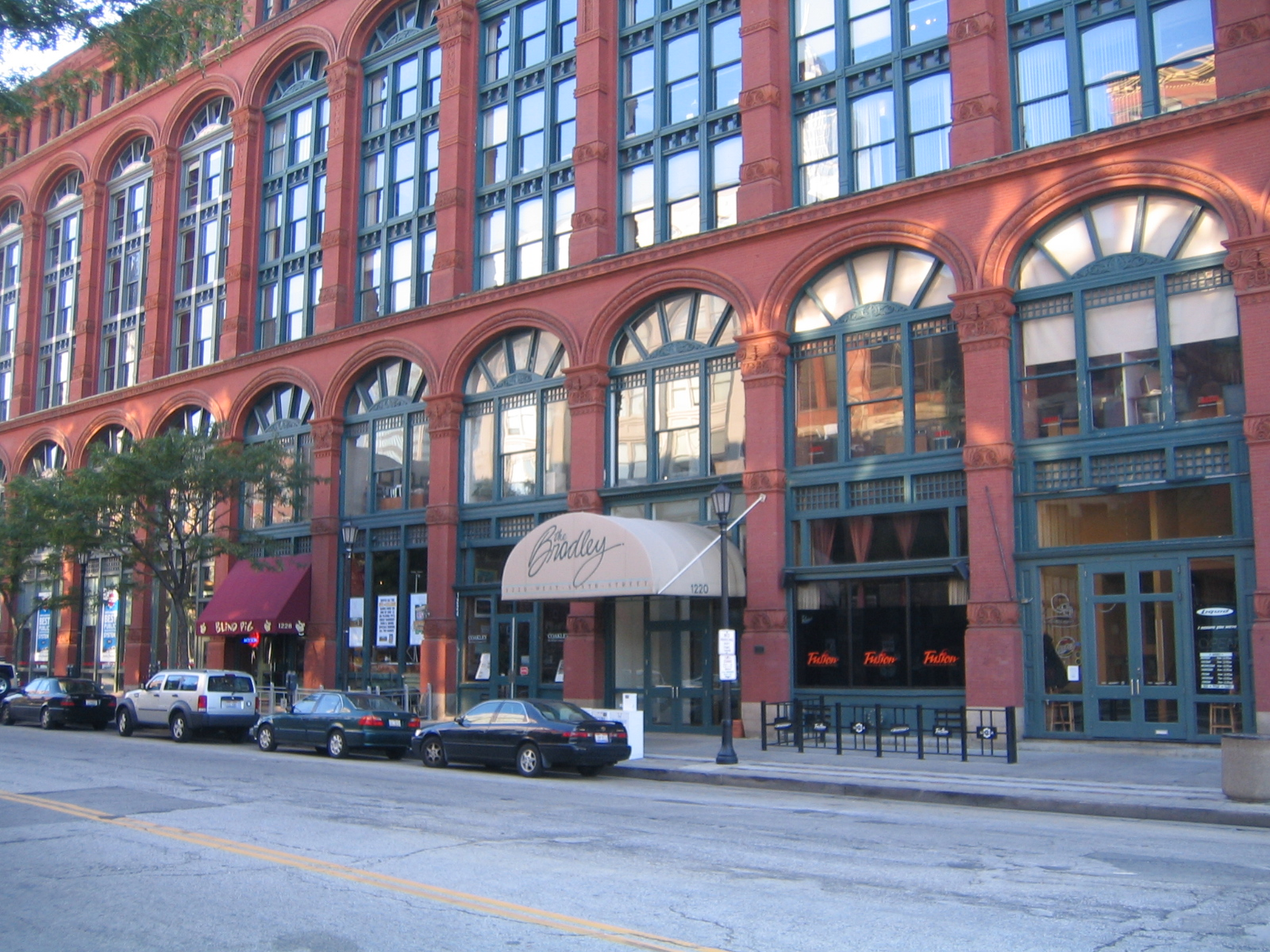
The Bradley Building is a restored warehouse, now apartments.

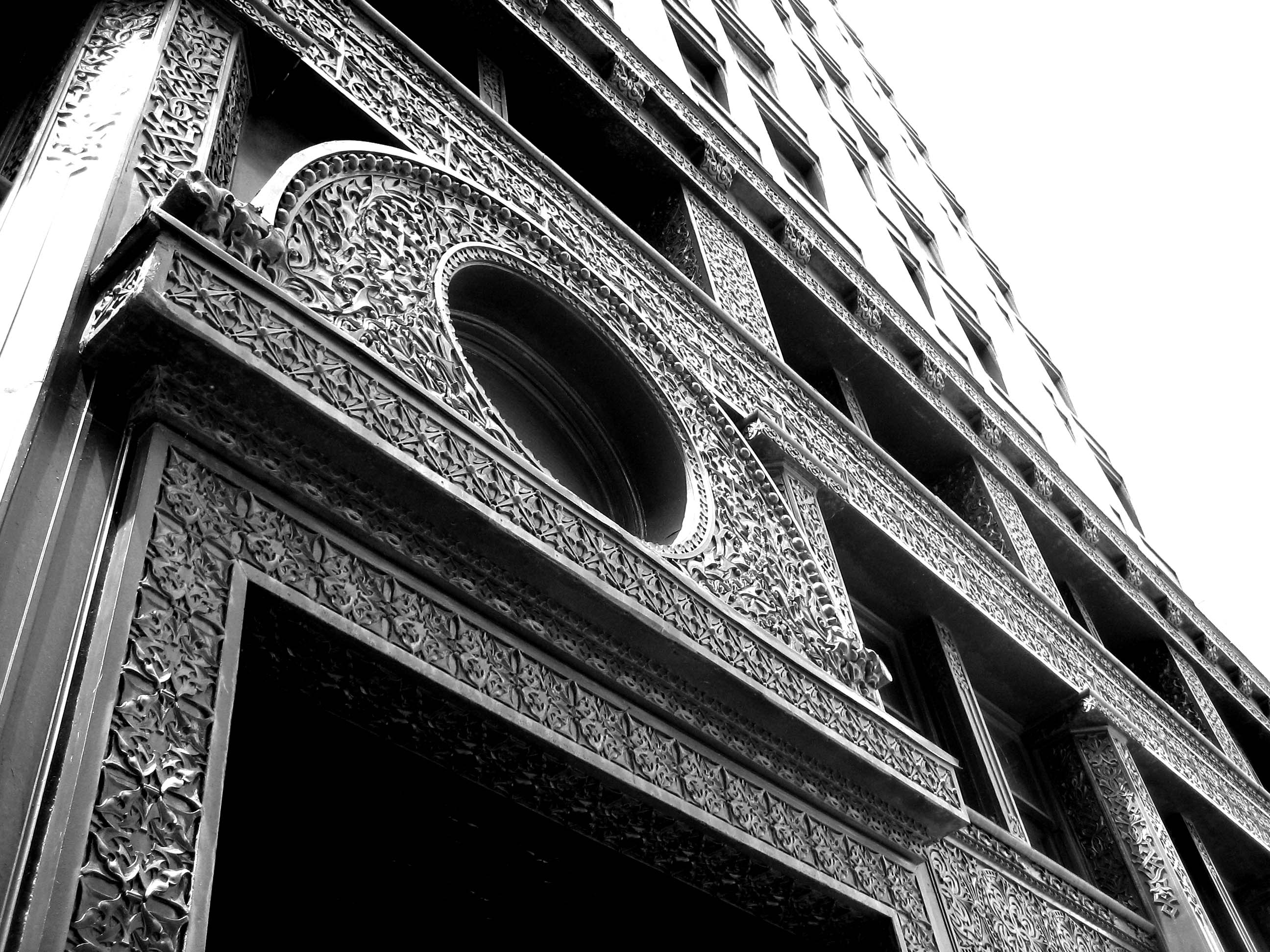
The decorative iron facade of the Rockefeller Building on Superior Avenue

== From industrial to residential ==
The metamorphosis to the Warehouse District's current state began with the opening of Hilarities Comedy Club in the late 1980s (Hilarities has since moved to E. 4th Street). The transformation of the district initially sought to attract artists in live-work spaces, but rent and popularity became too high, and drove artists to nearby Cleveland neighborhoods of Tremont or the St. Clair Superior.

Artists Steven B. Smith and S. Judson Wilcox were two early "urban pioneers": artists who settled the Warehouse District in Cleveland in 1981. Artists, musicians and renegades moved there to revel in Cleveland's industrial beauty.

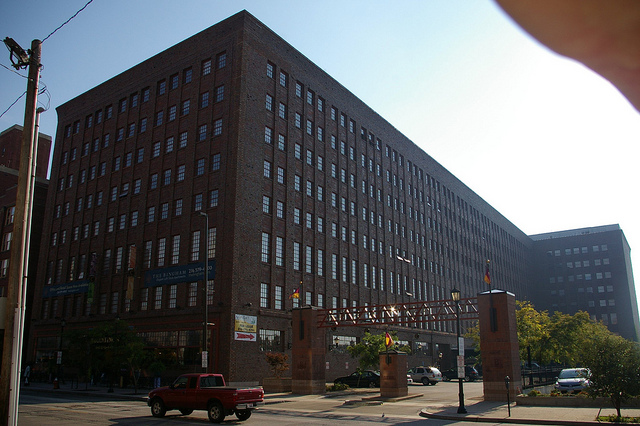
Historic Warehouse District - West Ninth Street

Smith's spot in the warehouse became a gathering spot for other artists in the building, including S. Judson Wilcox, Melissa Jay Craig (AKA "Field Marshal May Midwest"), Laszlo Gyorki, Ken Nevadomi, Randy Rigutto, Jay Clements, Beth Wolfe and others. Guests were offered keepsakes of miniature toy soldiers, babies in plastic bubbles or poetry.

Spaces Gallery was located on the first floor, making the warehouse the de facto epicenter of creative activity.

The affordability of Cleveland neighborhoods periodically caused mass migrations of artists. In the 80s, Smith was one of the urban pioneers to move into the Warehouse District. In 1985, he was one of many artists who moved from the warehouses to Tremont, in the typical pattern where artists move into undesirable but inexpensive neighborhoods, fixing up old buildings in which to live and work.

Although more than half of the original eight-block area has been razed and replaced by parking lots, by 2000 the remaining restored buildings were home to many restaurants and clubs. West Sixth Street is known as the heart of the district where various nightclubs, bars, and high-end restaurants are located.

The neighborhood has also seen many of the rehabilitated warehouses converted to office and residential space. The ornate Victorian age facades of these historic warehouses are often preserved and restored, while the interiors of the buildings experience complete transformation into contemporary and trendy spaces. Its apartments and condominiums have been responsible for a large portion of downtown Cleveland's recent population growth. Most of the remaining structures have been rehabilitated, and developers have started to plan and build infill construction projects.

== See also ==
- List of Registered Historic Places in Cleveland, Ohio
