= Salmon Portland Chase Halle =

American businessman and philanthropist

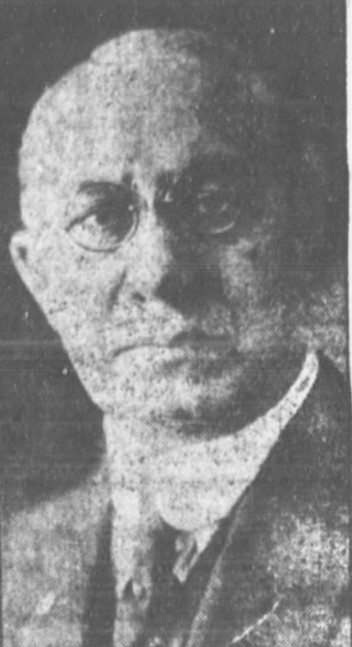
- Born: August 6, 1866; Cleveland, Ohio
- Died: September 13, 1949 (aged 83); Cleveland, Ohio
- Children: Marion Halle Strauss; S. Portland Halle
- Parents: Moses Halle (father); Rebecca Weil Halle (mother)
- Family: Kay Halle (niece)

Salmon Portland Chase Halle (August 6, 1866 – September 13, 1949) was an American businessman and philanthropist who co-founded the Halle Brothers department store.

== Biography ==
Halle was born to a Jewish family in Cleveland, Ohio, the eldest of two sons of Rebecca (née Weil) and Moses Halle (1832-1932). His brother was Samuel Horatio Halle (1868-1954). His mother died in 1871 and his father remarried in 1874 to Rosa Lowentritt with whom he had two daughters, Jessie and Minnie. Salmon and his brother founded the Halle Brothers department store in 1891 at 221 Superior Avenue near the Cleveland's Public Square where the brothers had bought out a hat and furrier shop owned by T.S. Paddock. Two years later, they moved to Euclid Avenue and East 4th Street and added ready-to-wear clothing to the merchandise mix. The firm was officially incorporated in 1902 as the Halle Bros. Co. Halle served as president until his retirement in 1921.

Halle served as director of the Mutual Building & Loan Co. and the Service Recorder Company; and was a founding member of the Print Club of Cleveland (1920), the Cleveland Advertising Club, the Cleveland Hospital Service Association, and the Jewish Welfare Federation (now the Jewish Federation of Cleveland) where he served as a trustee for 22 years. He served as vice-president of Mount Sinai Medical Center and was an executive at the American-Jewish Joint Distribution Committee for overseas relief. In 1945, Halle received the Charles Eisenman Award from the Jewish Welfare Federation. As an art collector, he donated much of his collection to the Cleveland Museum of Art.

He served as President of the National Dry Goods Association.

== Personal life ==
In 1893, Halle married Carrie B. Moss (died 1965); they had two children Marion Halle Strauss and S. Portland Halle. They lived in Shaker Heights, Ohio in a house designed by John William Creswell Corbusier. His niece is Cleveland journalist Kay Halle.
