= Leader Building =

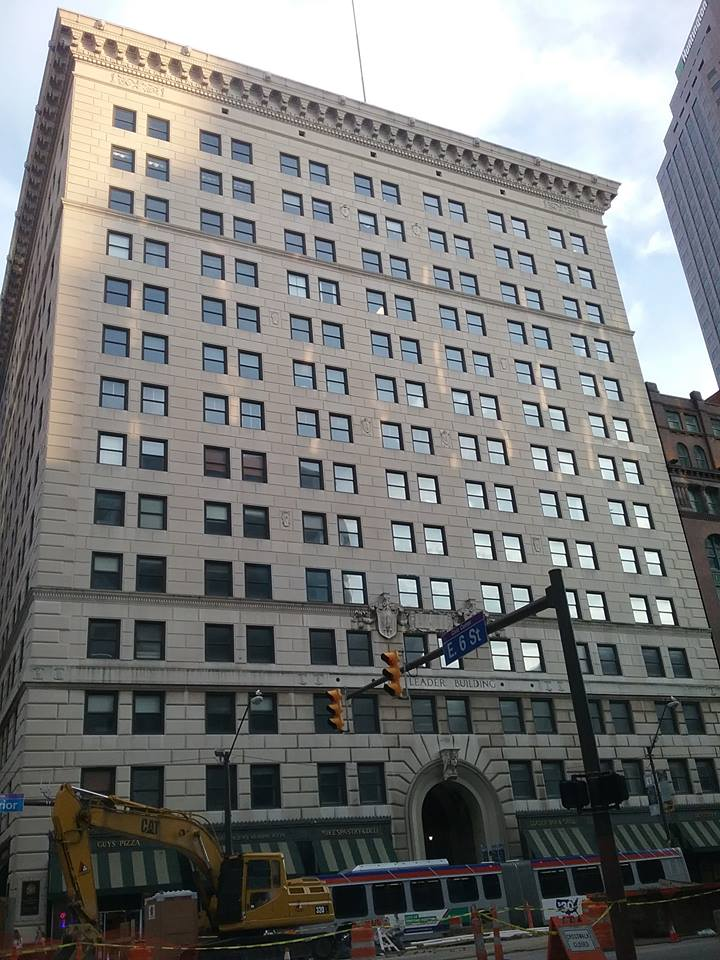
- Interactive map of the Leader Building area
- Former names: Leader-News Building

General information
- Type: Mixed-use
- Architectural style: Beaux-Arts
- Location: 526 Superior Avenue Cleveland, Ohio 44114 United States
- Coordinates: 41°30′3″N 81°41′25″W
- Construction started: 1911
- Completed: 1913
- Owner: K & D Group

Height
- Roof: 199 ft (61 m)

Technical details
- Floor count: 15
- Floor area: 322,600 sq ft (29,970 m^{2})

Design and construction
- Architect: Charles Adams Platt

The Leader Building is a 15-story high-rise building located at the southwest corner of Superior Avenue and East 6th Street in Downtown Cleveland, adjacent to the Cleveland Arcade and across the street from the Cleveland Public Library.

== History and architecture ==
Completed in 1913, the Leader Building was built by industrialist Dan Hanna to house The Cleveland Leader, a Cleveland newspaper he had recently acquired. The 199-foot (61 m), 322,600-square-foot (29,970 m^{2}) structure was designed by architect Charles Adams Platt in the Beaux-Arts style, and features high-quality interior materials. The limestone-clad building was also home to the Cleveland News, which Hanna owned as well. While The Cleveland Leader closed in 1917, the News continued to occupy a portion of the Leader Building until 1926. Its upper stories were rented out as office space, and were popular among lawyers. For 60 years, the building's basement was home to the Colonnade Cafeteria.

In 2014, the K & D Group acquired the building for $5.4 million. At the time of the purchase, the Leader Building was operated as office space, and had a 60% occupancy rate. The K & D Group announced plans for a mixed-use renovation, and said they would convert a portion of the building to apartments. When the renovations were completed in 2017, the company had converted the top 12 floors to apartments they named the Residences at the Leader. The ground floor remained as retail space and the second and third floors remained as offices.

The building served as the exterior for the Daily Planet in the 2025 film, Superman.

== See also ==
- List of tallest buildings in Cleveland, Ohio
