= Daniel Thompson (poet) =

American poet (1935–2004)

Daniel Thompson (1935 – May 6, 2004) was a Cleveland poet, civil rights activist and advocate for the homeless. Thompson became the first Poet Laureate for Cuyahoga County, Ohio.

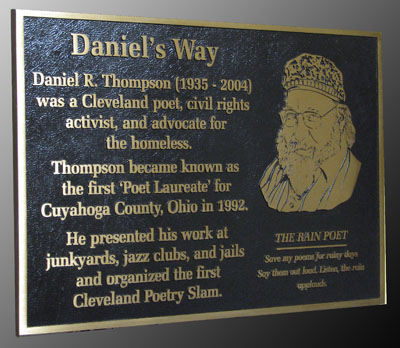
Daniel Thompson commemorative plaque

== Work ==
Thompson and Steven B. Smith co-edited "Crimes in the Dark: Reel-Life Art," also known as the "popcorn box" edition of ArtCrimes. It contained coupons for events in addition to the usual melange of poetry and images. ArtCrimes is consistent with the style of beat-era publications from the days of Kerouac, Corso and Ginsberg. One reviewer postulates that it is the most significant publication of the Cleveland underground art scene in recent history.

Thompson was an organizer of Junkstock, a poetry, art and music festival in the 80s. The highly acclaimed festival was held in a junk yard on Pearl Road in Cleveland. Thompson organized Cleveland's first poetry slam in 1992.

In 1992 Thompson was declared Poet Laureate of Cuyahoga County. The big book of Daniel: collected poems of Daniel Thompson edited by Maj Ragain, is published by Bottom Dog Press in 2011.

=== Music ===
Daniel Thompson performed on the 1996 CD "Genetic Memory" with percussionist Sam Phillips. Featuring the cut, "Tell Chief Wahoo", a commentary against the use of the Chief Wahoo logo by the Cleveland Indians, the "Genetic Memory" CD sold several thousand copies in the Cleveland area, and landed Sam Phillips an appearance on "The Howard Stern Show". In 1998 Daniel released a second CD, "Famous In The Neighborhood", as a companion piece to a poetry chapbook of the same name. On the CD, Daniel is backed by 2 Cleveland jazz legends, saxophonist Ernie Krivda, and (the late) guitarist Bill D'Arango, who joined Daniel for a 1998 showcase at The Jim Clevo Stage. Daniel also performed at The JCS in August 1998 as a special guest of the group Hostile Omish; clips of that performance are seen in the 2008 DVD documentary "Saints In The City", produced by Sam Phillips for Liberation Brew TV and widely featured on YouTube. A 2005 cover story in the now-defunct Cleveland Free Times, entitled, "Who Owns Daniel?", addressed the disputes over the ownership rights to Daniel's poems and recordings which arose after Daniel's death. Thompson also toured with the Cleveland percussion group Drumplay.

=== Civic activism ===
Thompson contributed poems to the Homeless Grapevine newspaper and wall calendar. The Northeast Ohio Coalition for the Homeless used these items to raise money. He protested against the name of the Cleveland "Indians" and their use of the "Chief Wahoo" logo. His poem "Tell Chief Wahoo" was used on t-shirts to promote awareness by the Committee of 500 Years of Dignity and Resistance. In 1986, Thompson organized readings at the Justice center.

Thompson promoted the idea of renaming the University Circle portions of East Blvd. after Hart Crane and Langston Hughes. A street was named for him after his death, Daniel's Way can be found in downtown Cleveland. Cleveland poet Chris Franke failed to paint his house after being ordered by the city to do so. Thompson arranged a creative solution where Franke did community service: reading his poems to a soup-line audience at a homeless shelter.

== Poetry collections ==
- ArtCrimes 4, 1988 edited by Thompson, Daniel
- Famous in the Neighborhood, 1989 Burning Press, Cleveland, OH
- Even the Broken Letters of the Heart Spell Earth, 1998, Bottom Dog Press
- The Rain Poet, 2004, Green Panda Press, Cleveland, OH
- Double X, 2004 Published by Jim Lang, (of Split Whiskey), Lakewood, OH
- Comforting the Dead, 2004, Green Panda Press, Cleveland, OH
- The Big Book of Daniel: Collected Poems of Daniel Thompson, edited by Maj Ragain, 2011 Bottom Dog Press, Huron, OH
