= 1717 East Ninth Building =

Skyscraper in Downtown Cleveland

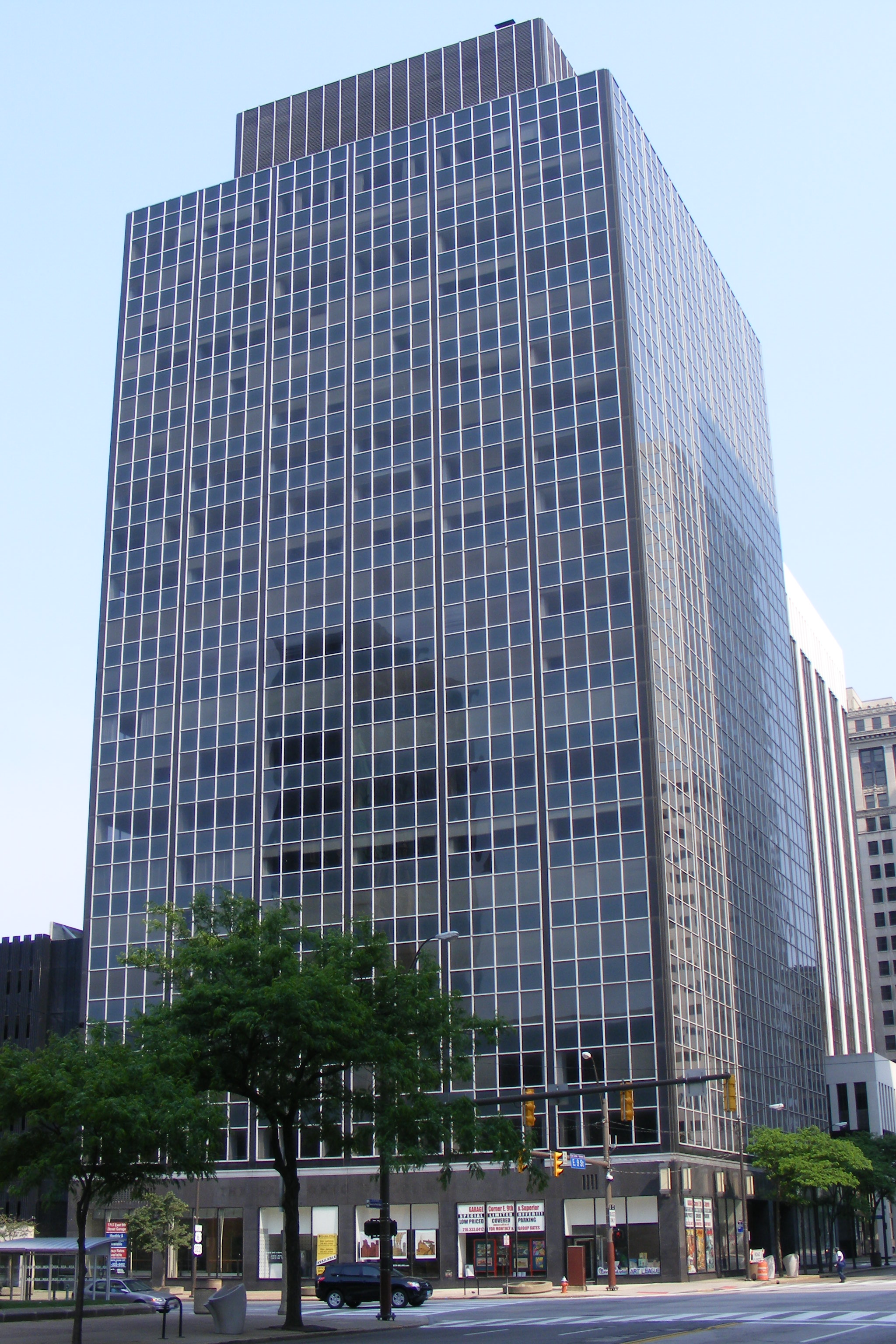

- Location within Ohio
- Former names: Tishman Building; East Ohio Gas Building; East Ohio Building

General information
- Status: Completed
- Type: High-rise
- Architectural style: International
- Classification: Residential
- Location: Nine-Twelve District, 1717 East 9th Street, Cleveland, Ohio, United States
- Coordinates: 41.5021394°N 81.6879576°W
- Current tenants: Residences at 1717 (K & D Properties)
- Construction started: 1958
- Completed: 1959
- Opened: 1959
- Owner: Sovereign Partners, LLC

Height
- Architectural: 275 feet (84 m)
- Roof: 275 feet (84 m)

Technical details
- Floor count: 21
- Grounds: 346,500 square feet (32,190 m^{2})

Design and construction
- Architecture firm: Emery Roth & Sons
- Main contractor: Tishman Realty & Construction Co.

Renovating team
- Renovating firm: Tishman Properties

Other information
- Parking: 600-car parking garage, attached
- The East Ohio Building
- U.S. National Register of Historic Places
- Location: Cleveland, Ohio
- Built: 1959
- Architect: Emery Roth & Sons
- Architectural style: International
- NRHP reference No.: 12001212
- Designated: January 23, 2013

1717 East Ninth Building, also known as the East Ohio Building, is a skyscraper in Downtown Cleveland, the U.S. state of Ohio's emerging Nine-Twelve District. Completed in 1959, it was one of the first modernist high-rises in Cleveland, along with the Illuminating Building, standing at 275 feet (84 meters).

== History ==
It was designed by Emery Roth and Sons of New York City. Tishman Properties also of New York City was the developer. Ground was broken in March 1958 and in April 1959 it opened to the public. There is a 600-car parking garage attached to the tower. It was built on the site of the old Greyhound bus station, after Greyhound built a new bus terminal on Superior Avenue a few blocks away from the East Ohio Building in 1948.

East Ohio Gas, Cleveland's natural gas supplier, occupied the tower until its merger with Richmond, Virginia-based Dominion Resources. On the lobby level, East Ohio had a customer pay center and exhibits of the benefits of natural gas appliances. In addition, they had a meter showing how much natural gas was supplied to Cleveland.

On November 22, 2006, the largely vacant building was bought by New York City-based Sovereign Partners, LLC for around $12 million. The buying group planned on making certain improvements to the building, the details were announced in early 2007. It was named to the National Register of Historic Places on January 23, 2013.

== Conversion to apartments ==
In March 2012, the K & D Group of Willoughby, Ohio announced that it had signed a contract to buy the 21-story tower and planned to convert it to 223 apartments, making it the tallest fully residential building in Cleveland. As reported in 2012 and 2013, K & D then planned, contingent on tax credits and other financing, to open the first of 223 apartments in July 2014 and to finish the $65 million conversion by August 2015.

== See also ==
- List of tallest buildings in Cleveland
