= The Cleveland Leader =

Former newspaper published in Cleveland, Ohio, United States

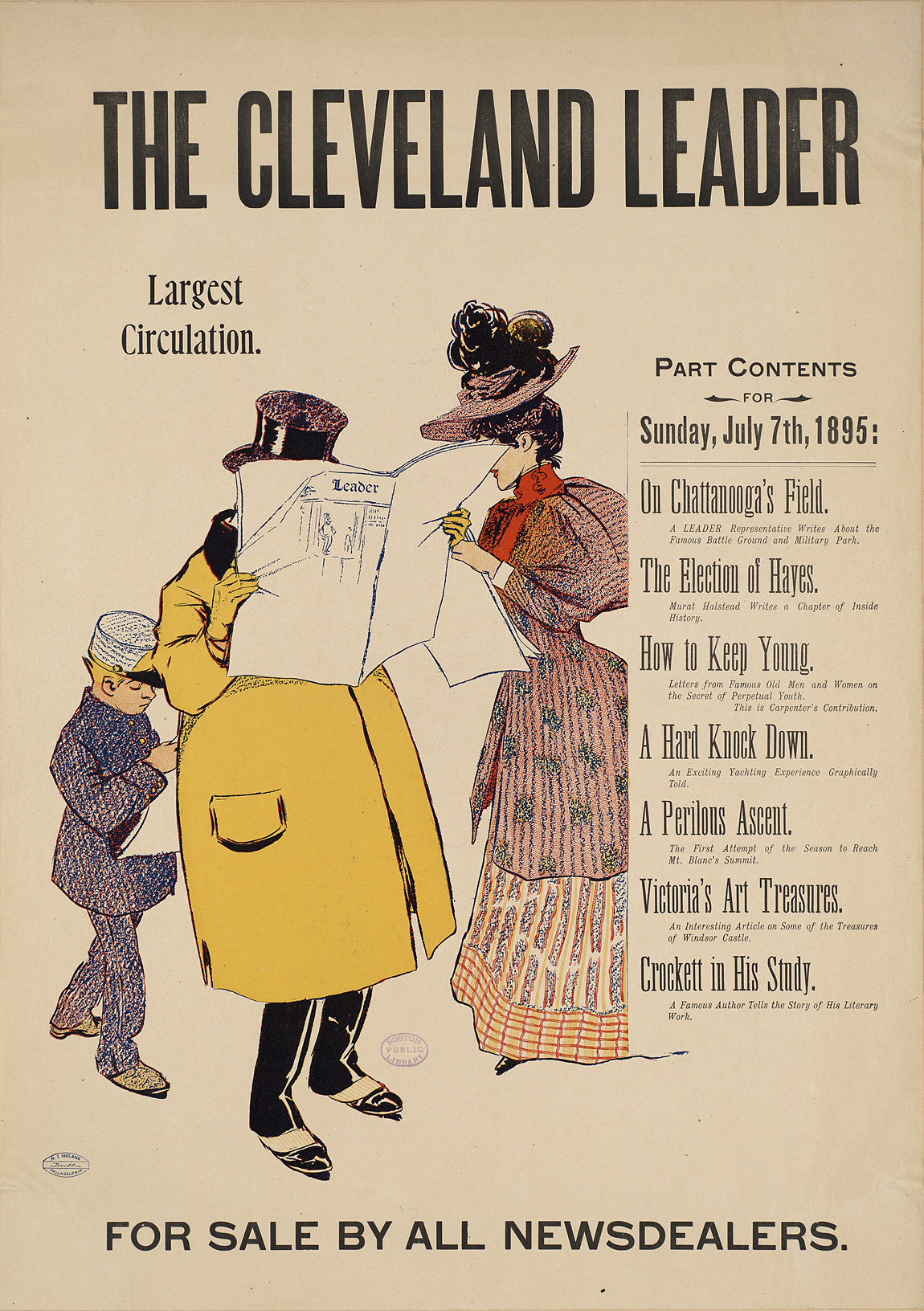
- 1895 advertising poster
- Founder: Edwin Cowles
- Founded: 1854
- Ceased publication: 1917
- Language: English
- City: Cleveland
- Country: United States

The Cleveland Leader was a newspaper published in Cleveland from 1854 to 1917.

== History ==
The Cleveland Leader was created in 1854 by Edwin Cowles, who merged a variety of abolitionist, pre-Republican Party titles under the Leader. From a program celebrating the opening of the Leader Building in 1913, "In 1847 an anti-slavery Whig paper which had been published for about a year in Olmsted Falls, now, as then, a small village, was moved to Cleveland and changed from a weekly to a daily, retaining the name of "True. Democrat." That event is commonly reckoned the beginning of the Cleveland Leader..."

The Leader's initial editorial bias was reflective of the antebellum period in Ohio; pro-Union, anti-slavery, but also according to several sources, virulently anti-Catholic. The Encyclopedia of Cleveland History notes, "Cowles was as outspoken a nativist as he was a Republican, heading the Cleveland chapter of the anti-Catholic Order of the American Union, and carrying on an editorial war with Manly Tello, editor of the Catholic Universe."

The Leader was explicitly political from its founding. Cowles' March 5, 1890 New York Times obituary claims, "In the Winder [sic] of 1854-5 the germ of the Republican Party was formed in the Leader editorial rooms as a meeting was held there which resulted in the first Republican Convention, which was held at Pittsburg. Col. R. C. Parsons, Joseph Medill, John C. Vaughn, Judge R. P. Spaulding, and J. F. Keeler, were at the meeting, which resulted in the consolidation of the Know-Nothing, Whig, and Free Soil Parties into the Republican Party."

The Leader quickly became the most influential newspaper in Ohio. "By 1875 its circulation of 13,000 was double that of the Herald and 5 times that of the Plain Dealer. Cowles kept the paper technologically up to date, importing Cleveland's first perfecting press in 1877 and pioneering the use of electrotype plates in Ohio."

After Cowles' death in 1890, the Leader began a swift decline, as competition from the Plain Dealer and other newspapers took advantage of the huge void left by Cowles personal control. Many examples of the Leader's poster art from the period immediately after Cowles' death in the 1890s are included in a collection at the New York Public Library as some of the finest examples of late Victorian American poster art. Despite the marketing efforts, the Leader continued its decline. Charles Otis began a consolidation of local newspapers with the Cleveland World in 1904, and the Leader in 1905. Through Otis, ownership of the Leader passed through various hands in the famous Hanna family, via Marcus Hanna's son-in-law Medill McCormick, married to Ruth Hanna McCormick, then to Daniel R. Hanna, Marcus Hanna's son. By 1917, the Leader had been sold to the Plain Dealer, just four years after moving into the Leader Building in 1913.
