= Chris Franke =

American poet

Chris Franke is an American experimental poet from Charlottesville, Virginia. His work includes concrete poetry, sound poetry, performance poetry, and various forms of conventional poetry. He has performed as a member of the Endangered Species Trio as a reader of his poetry to harp and flute accompaniment. His poems have also been included in the paintings of other artists.

Franke has performed sound poetry readings and more conventional poetry readings in Northeast Ohio for decades. His first book of poetry, Title, was published in 1969 by the Cleveland State University Press and featured a number of concrete pieces. He coined the terms "flip words" and "toe-faced words" to describe mirror reflection words and puddle reflection words respectively. He also coined the terms "typoons" to describe free-form (non-linear) emoticons he has had in print since Title, "articles" to describe visual poetry collages, and has extended the meaning of the word "versicle" to also mean very small books of poetry, particularly concrete poetry.
