= Halle Brothers Co. =

Defunct department store chain

Halle Brothers Company
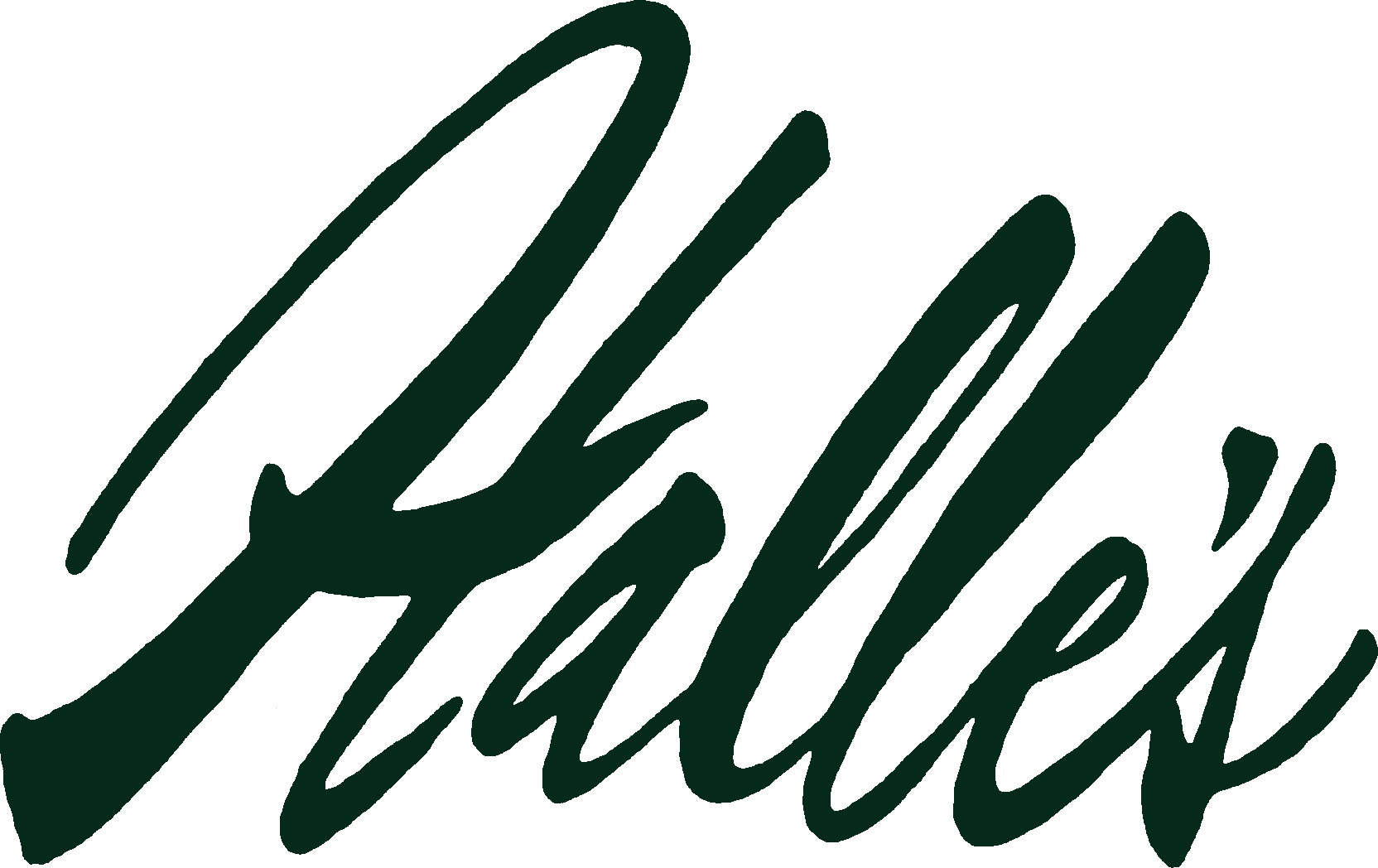

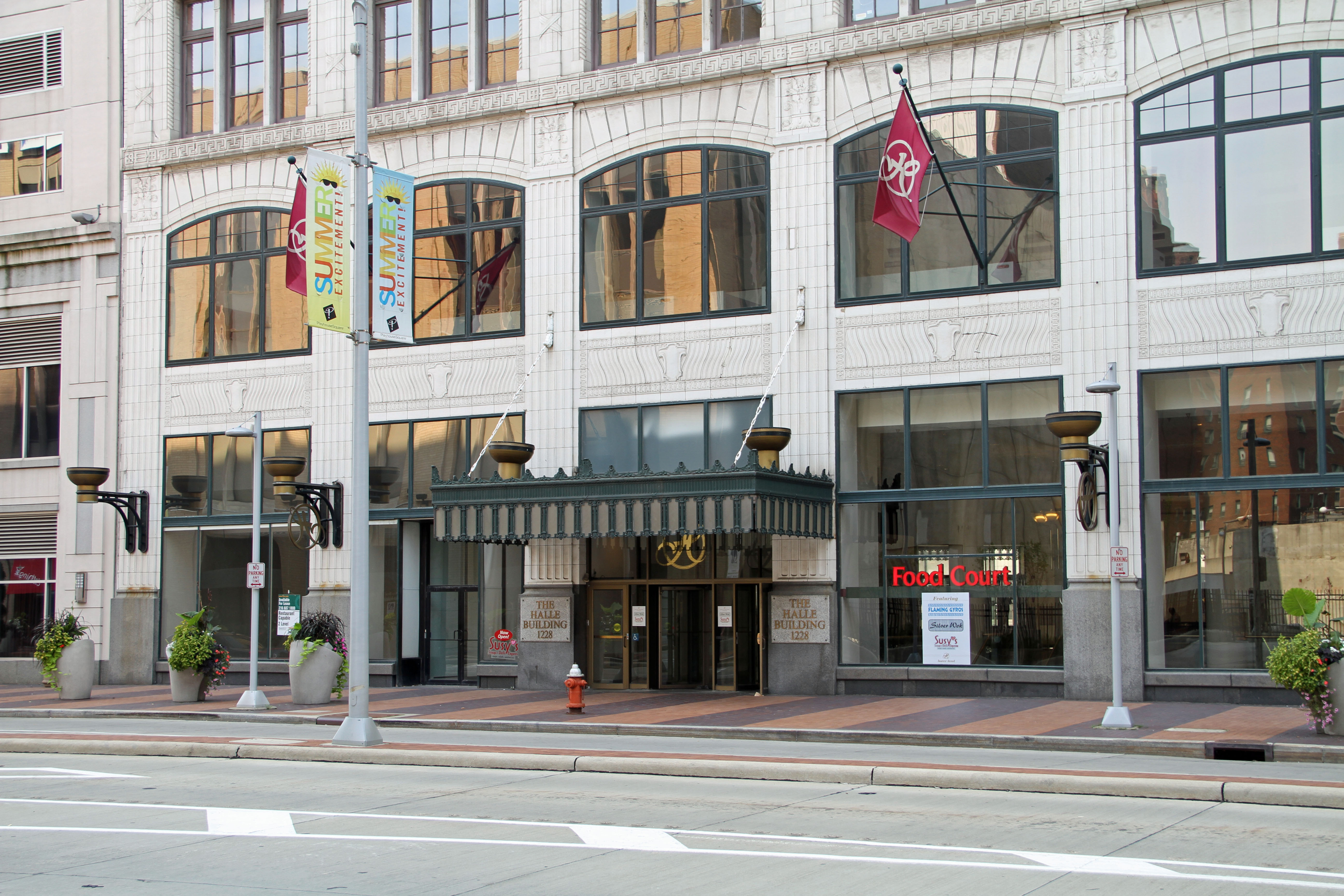
- The Halle Building
- Industry: Retail
- Founded: 1891; 135 years ago
- Founders: Samuel Horatio Halle; Salmon Portland Chase Halle
- Defunct: 1982; 44 years ago
- Fate: Liquidation
- Headquarters: Cleveland, Ohio, United States
- Products: Clothing, footwear, bedding, furniture, jewelry, beauty products, and housewares

Halle Brothers Co., commonly referred to as Halle's, was a department store chain based in Cleveland, Ohio. During most of its 91-year history, Halle's focused on higher-end merchandise which it combined with personal service. It was the first major department store in Cleveland to open a suburban branch store.

== History ==
The Halle Brothers Co. (1891–1982) was considered the leading department store company in Cleveland, Ohio, United States. Founded on February 7, 1891, by brothers Samuel Horatio Halle and Salmon Portland Chase Halle, the first store was located at 221 Superior Avenue near the city's Public Square, where the brothers had bought out a hat and furrier shop owned by T.S. Paddock. The firm was officially incorporated in 1902 as the Halle Bros. Co.

Years later, they moved to Euclid Avenue and East 4th Street and added ready-to-wear clothing to the merchandise mix.

== Expansion ==
After growing and moving several times, the company eventually built its main store at 1228 Euclid Avenue by 1910. Standing at 195 feet, it was the tallest department store ever constructed in the city. It was designed by New York architect Henry Bacon and was called elegant yet refined in its detailing of its white terra cotta facade.

By 1927, their new $5 million Huron-Prospect Building was opened, creating an emporium in what is now known as the city's Theater District.

Halle's was well regarded as a high-end department store, receiving praise for opening stores beyond the usual shopping district of Public Square in downtown Cleveland. As of 1927, Halle's selling region included western New York, Pennsylvania, Northeast Ohio, and Indiana.

Halle's devotion to personalized service was well known, and each new employee received the company's pledge to service upon their hiring:

Many of us are confronted by the necessity of deciding on matters that arise in the daily routine of business, not covered by the "Rules and Regulations." For helpful aid in such cases, remember one thing: This establishment puts no premium on clever tricks or cute business practice. Be open, frank, above all, Honest. Decide on the simple law of right or wrong-then you can't go wrong.

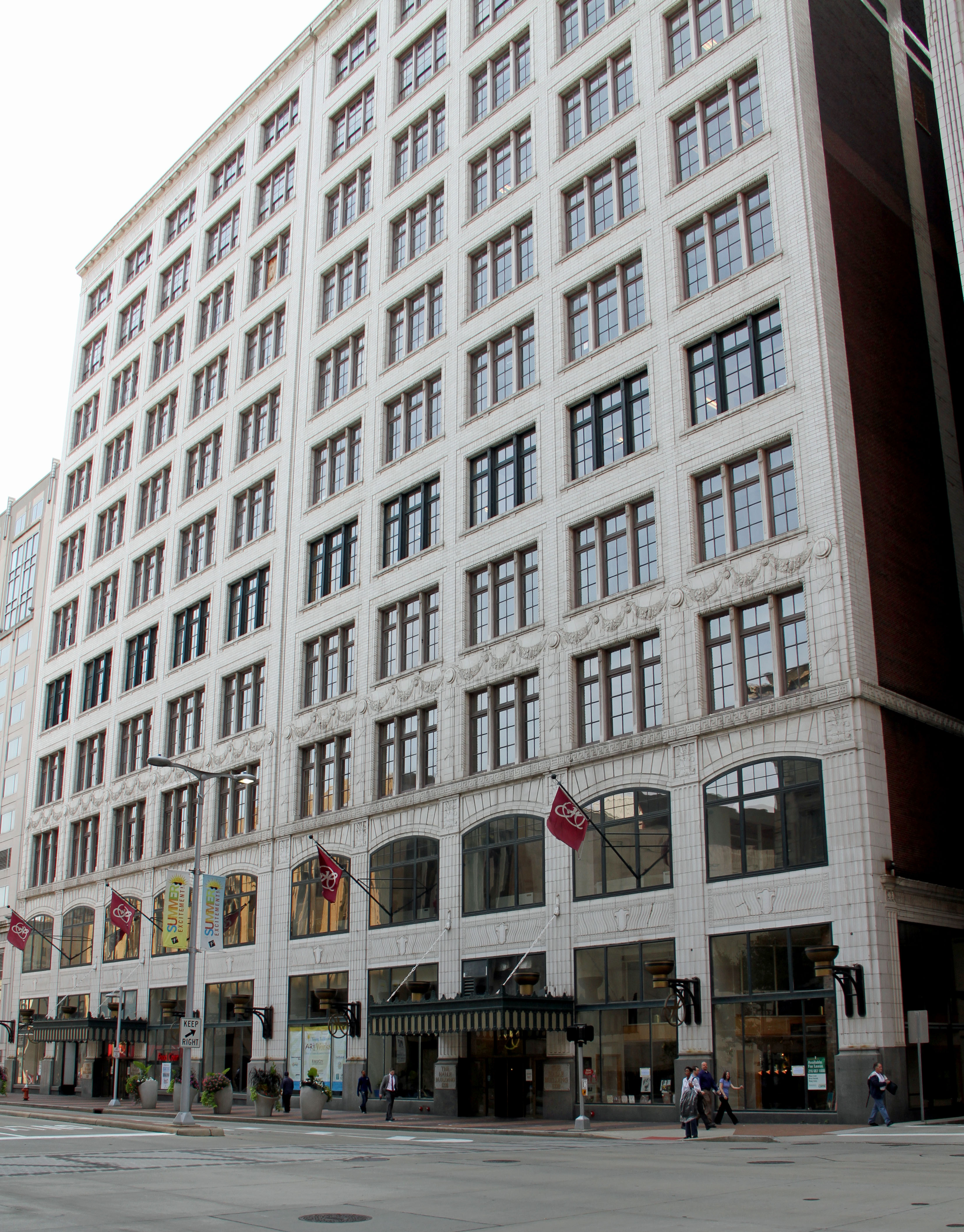
The Halle Building in Cleveland is listed on the National Register of Historic Places.

When the flagship store expanded in 1927, TIME praised the business for helping to turn the city of Cleveland into a more metropolitan city, and compared Halle's to Lord & Taylor, B. Altman & Co., R.H. Stearns, Marshall Field & Co., Bullock's, and Maison Blanche.

Although the company sustained losses during the Great Depression, business grew again after World War II as Halle's began developing suburban branches starting in 1948 under the leadership of Walter Murphy Halle. The company completed a $10 million modernization at Playhouse Square that included a new service building on Prospect Avenue and the West Wing addition to its original building in 1949.

Over time, the store came to be enjoyed by the city's "carriage trade" society, especially during the Christmas season, when the flagship store had its very own popular version of Santa Claus, a fictional elf named Mr. Jingeling, who could be found, as the TV and radio jingle reminded kids, "on Halle's seventh floor" serving as Santa's "Keeper Of The Keys." Mr. Jingleing was created in 1956 as a way to promote the department store's toys. It was originally a one-time promotion in 1956, but it instantly became popular and was turned into an annual tradition. The first Mr. Jingeling was Thomas V. Moviel, a Cleveland police officer.

In 2014, the K & D Group of Willoughby, Ohio entered into an agreement to purchase the Halle Building and turn it into high-end apartments. The building was sold to the group for 20 million dollars and was renovated into luxury apartments.

== Mr. Jingeling ==
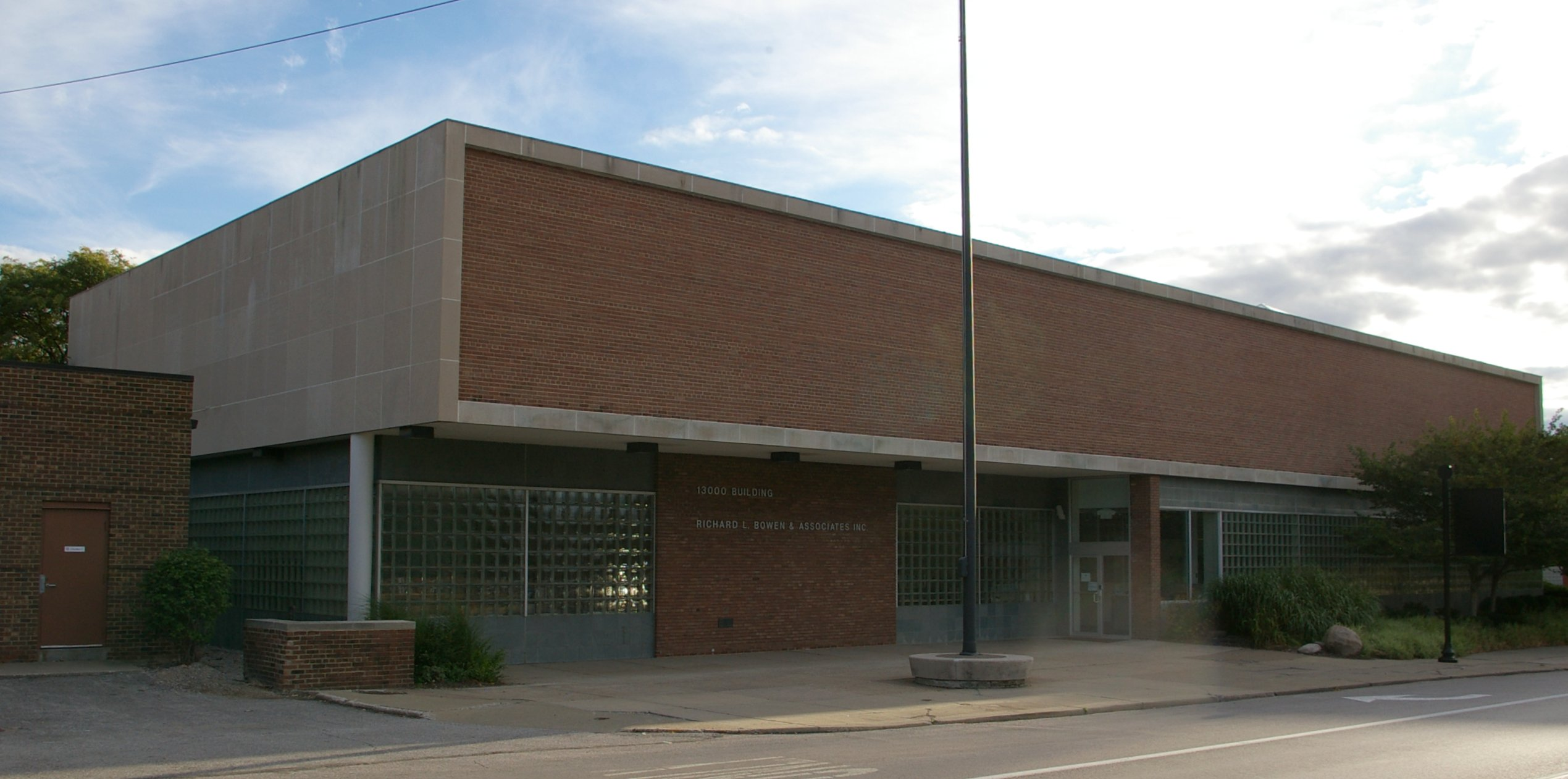
The former Halle's Shaker Square building at 13000 Shaker Boulevard in Cleveland, Ohio. Built in 1948 on a design by architect Robert A. Little, son-in-law by marriage to Anne Murphy Halle Little, it is listed on the National Register of Historic Places.

Mr. Jingeling is the "Keeper of the Keys" to Santa's workshop, a holiday tradition in Cleveland. Mr. Jingeling was originally sponsored by Halle's. He served as the store's Christmas season spokesman on television and also acted as Santa's representative in the store. Mr. Jingeling became the "Keeper of the Keys" as a reward for saving Christmas when Santa lost the key to his Treasure House of Toys. Jingeling saved the day by making a new key. Mr. Jingeling was created in 1956 by Frank Jacobi, head of a Chicago advertising agency to promote the toys sold at Halle's Department Store in Cleveland. This was originally planned as a one-time promotion for the 1956 holiday season, but was immediately popular and became an annual tradition.

Mr. Jingeling was Santa's top elf who counted down the days from Thanksgiving to Christmas for Santa. He wore a green and gold costume with a wide black belt and carried a large keyring with all the keys for Santa's workshop. He had white hair like Santa, but was bald on top and had no beard. He could be found between Thanksgiving and Christmas on the seventh floor of Halle's. After Halle's closed in 1982, Mr. Jingeling moved to Santaland on the tenth floor of Higbee's Department Store. He was assisted in his duties by the Play Lady, also in costume. Children could sit on his lap and tell Mr. Jingeling what they wanted for Christmas, knowing he had a direct connection to Santa. At the end of the visit, he gave each child a large cardboard key. The children were told to put the key under their pillow on Christmas Eve. This would help them fall asleep and have good dreams while waiting for Santa to come.

During the Christmas season, Mr. Jingeling also appeared for a five-minute daily segment on the local children's television series on WEWS-TV (Channel 5) Captain Penny, where he would tell stories and sing songs about the North Pole. His appearances began and ended with the Mr/ Jingeling advertising jingle, which reminded children that he could be seen in person on the seventh floor of Halle's Department Store.

=== The Mr. Jingeling theme song ===
Mister Jingeling/How you ting-a-ling/Keeper of the keys/On Halle's seventh floor/We'll be looking for/You to turn the keys

=== Variation ===
Mister Jingeling/How you ting-a-ling/Keeper of the keys/Don't you dare be late/For you have a date/On Halle's seventh floor

Mr. Jingeling was first played in personal appearances by Tom Moviel, a Cleveland policeman who worked at the jail and actually carried jail cell door keys while playing the part.

The television appearances were by Cleveland Play House actor Max Ellis for the first eight seasons. When Ellis died from a heart attack in the summer of 1964, Karl Mackey, managing director of Lakewood Little Theatre took over for one season. Earl Keyes, the producer and director of the Captain Penny show, took over in 1965. His wife Nadine was occasionally called on to play Mrs. Jingeling. Along with the department stores that had sponsored him, Mr. Jingeling went out of business in the late 1980s, Keyes acquired the copyright for the character and continued making holiday season appearances as Mr. Jingeling for many years. His last official appearance in costume was in 1995 at the Tower City Center.

In the late 1990s, the Penitentiary Glen Nature Center began a nostalgic Halle's 7th Floor Holiday Memories Exhibit, including a re-creation of Mr. Jingeling's seventh-floor castle from 1956. When Keyes visited the exhibit in 1999, he was recognized by fans who formed a long line to get his autograph.

Jonathan Wilhelm took over the role and began making public appearances during the holiday season in from 2003 until 2012.

In 2012, Greg Benedetto took over the role of Mr. Jingeling, making public appearances throughout Northeast Ohio. He hands out cardboard keys just like the ones from Halle's, singing songs, telling stories, and keeping the tradition alive for generations old and new.

== Slow decline ==
While the company outlasted many other department and specialty stores in Cleveland, the 1960s brought hard times to the family business. With the closing of Sterling-Lindner Co. and Bonwit Teller, both located across from the main Halle's store in downtown, and the decline of Cleveland's Playhouse Square theaters, downtown shopping shifted to Cleveland's Public Square where rivals Higbee's and The May Company operated stores with easy access to Cleveland's Rapid Transit system. The company attempted to counter this competitive disadvantage by leasing, in 1956, a number of buses from the Cleveland Transit System for the purpose of providing a free shuttle service from Public Square to Playhouse Square, a move initially seen as an interim measure pending completion of a proposed subway line under Euclid Avenue (a project for which voters had approved public financing in 1953). When the planned subway failed to materialize (then-County Engineer Albert S. Porter refused to go forward with the project believing that the future of local transportation was linked to the freeway), Halle's was forced to continue the shuttle service.

Without the draw of other stores, and rising crime on Cleveland's near east side, it became more difficult for suburban shoppers to justify a trip to the flagship Halle's store. In early 1969, Halle's followed suit from The May Company in 1966, issuing their own personal pink charge card with its new modern block print style logo for its customers, and discontinuing use of the Charge-A-Plate Associates shared metal notched charge card. Higbee's did the same in August 1969, issuing their own beige charge card with their new logo, thus ending all local department stores using Charge-A-Plate Associates cards.

Suffering from an overbuilt flagship, the abandonment of Downtown Cleveland and over-expansion into the outlying areas, the company was sold to Marshall Field's in 1970, under which it deteriorated, falling behind local rivals Higbee's and May Company. Attempts to lure less upscale patrons with mid-priced goods failed, forcing the 1974 resignation of then-president/CEO Chisholm Halle, Walter's son and the grandson of Samuel H. Halle, who had died in 1954. In 1969, Under Chisolm Halle, the Halle Bros. Co. retired their traditional Old English script in favor of a more "modern" look with simple block lettering and shortened their name on printed material to just "Halle's". This new logo did not resonate well with Cleveland shoppers who were mourning the loss of Halle's former logo. In late 1969, Halle's reverted to the Old English logo but kept all printed material to simply "Halle's". In 1971, after Marshall Field's purchase of the chain, they did attempt to modernize Halle's look, investing in a brand make-over campaign over the course of the year, including retiring Halle's traditional Old English script logo and re-instituting a new logo which matched Marshall Field's current logo.

== Demise ==
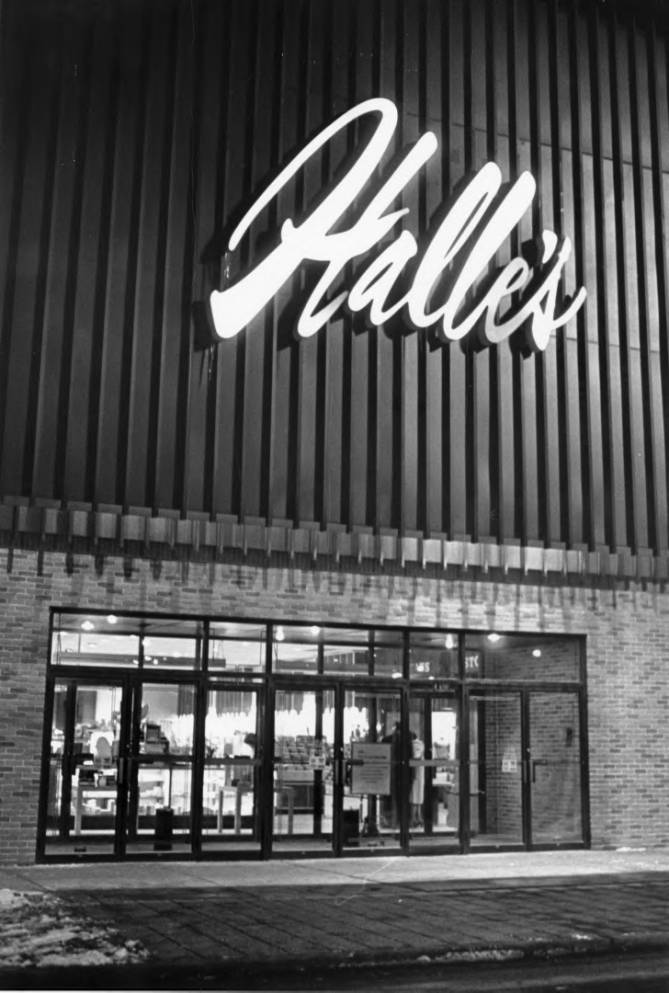
Halle's store at Town & Country Shopping Center, Columbus, Ohio (née The Union)

In November 1981, Field's sold Halle's (now numbering 15 stores in Ohio and Pennsylvania) to Associated Investors Corporation, led by Columbus, Ohio businessman Jerome Schottenstein, whose primary holdings included the Value City discount store chain. At first, the sale seemed to hold promise for Halle's. Schottenstein attempted to allay community fears by placing full-page newspaper ads in which he promised to see to the continuation of the chain's traditions.

However, Associated Investors subsequently liquidated the company in 1982 with all the stores either sold or closed despite attempts to operate them as a smaller suburban six-unit operation. The company planned a location at Randall Park Mall in North Randall, Ohio in the 1970s, but later canceled the idea. The Halle's space remained empty until construction of a multiscreen cineplex in the late 1990s.

== Columbus locations ==
The Union Co., a division of Manhattan Industries, was an upscale department store with six locations in and around the Columbus, Ohio region. Manhattan sold the chain to Marshall Field & Co. of Chicago in 1980 who paid $8 million (~$25.5 million in 2024) and rebranded the chain to Halle's.

== In popular culture ==
- Halle's former flagship store at Playhouse Square Center was redeveloped as offices by Forest City Enterprises with space for retail shops on the street level and a food court in the former Downstairs Store. During the late 1990s, the building was also used as the main location of the fictional Winfred-Louder store in The Drew Carey Show on ABC.
- Actress Halle Berry, who was born in Cleveland, was named after the famed department store.
- The Halle Trophy Race for women aviators was named after the department store, which was the inaugural sponsor of the race.

== See also ==
- List of defunct department stores of the United States
