= K & D Group =

Real-estate holder in Ohio, US

The K & D Group, of Willoughby, Ohio, is an American major real-estate holder of numerous prominent office and residential properties in Northeast Ohio. K&D Properties was originally established as a partnership by Douglas E. Price, III and Karen M. Paganini in 1984.

The partnership began purchasing and renovating properties and formed K&D in 1998 to manage and acquire future properties. Today, as Northeast Ohio's largest privately owned property management and development firm, K&D owns and manages over 45 apartment communities, consisting of nearly 10,000 units throughout Northeast Ohio, and includes properties attractive to high, moderate, and lower income individuals and families. Mr. Price functions as K&D's Chief Executive Officer, and Mrs. Paganini is its president.

In 2016, it was announced by CEO Douglas Price III that the K&D Group had purchased the historic Cleveland landmark, The Terminal Tower, for $38.5 million. This purchase was part of a $100 million project to transform floors four through 15 into luxury apartments.

In 2021, K&D was criticized for its slow response to flooding in its apartments at Terminal Tower.

== Properties ==
- Terminal Tower
- 668 Euclid Avenue
- 1717 East Ninth Building
- Halle Building
- Hanna Building
- Keith Building
- Leader Building
- Reserve Square
- Rockefeller Building
- Stonebridge Condos
- Stonebridge Plaza
- Franklin Hall
- 55 Public Square
- Artcraft Building
