= Rockefeller Building (Cleveland) =

Coordinates: 41°29′53″N 81°41′51″W

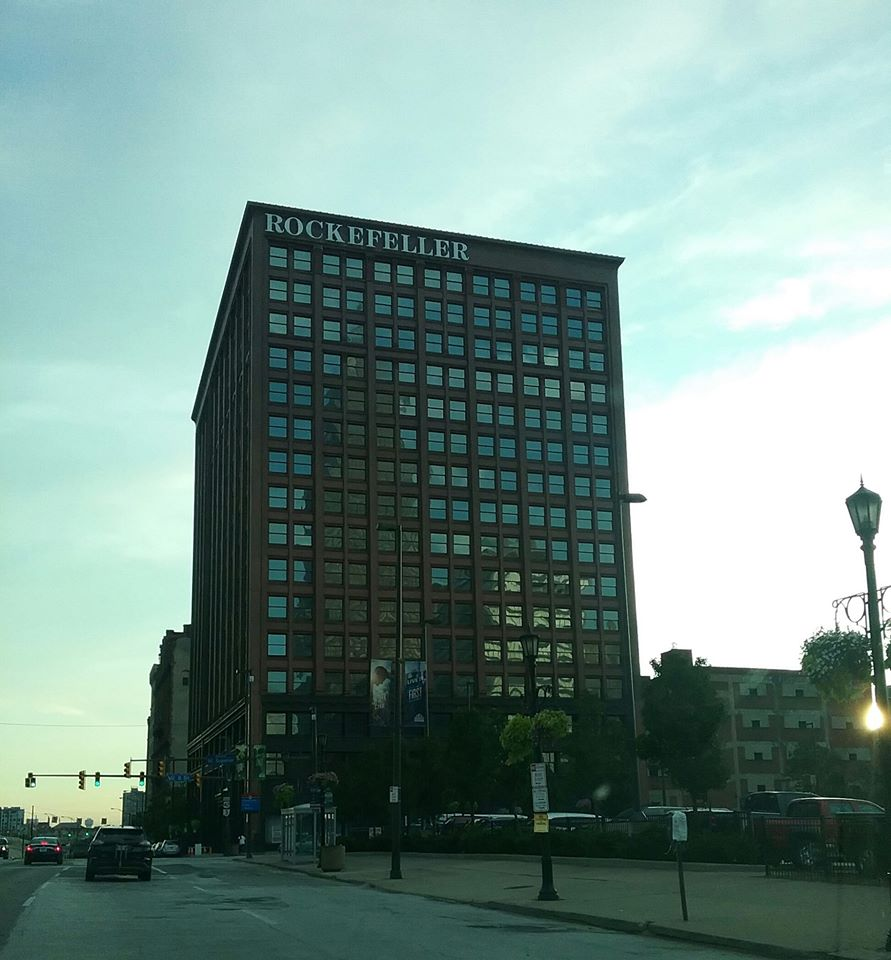
- The Rockefeller on Superior Avenue
- Interactive map of the Rockefeller Building area
- Former names: Kirby Building

General information
- Type: Office
- Location: 614 West Superior Ave., Cleveland, Ohio 44113 United States
- Construction started: 1903
- Completed: 1905

Height
- Roof: 64.6 m (212 ft)

Technical details
- Floor count: 17
- Lifts/elevators: 6

Design and construction
- Architects: Knox & Elliott

The Rockefeller Building is a historic high-rise office building in downtown Cleveland, Ohio, United States, that was built between 1903 and 1905 and sits at the corner of West 6th and Superior Avenue across from the Tower City Center complex. The building stands at a height of 212 ft. (64.62 m), rising 17 stories above the street and is named after the Standard Oil of Ohio founder John D. Rockefeller. The massively wide building acts as an entry point into the very popular and populated Warehouse District, Cleveland. In 1973, the building was put on the list of National Register of Historic Places.

There are many places in the city and suburbs named after Rockefeller, including Rockefeller Park, the Rockefeller City Greenhouse, Rockefeller Lagoon, Rockefeller Center At, Rockefeller Road, and Rockefeller Avenue. However, his namesake building is the most well-known of these.

Rockefeller was known in later life for his generosity towards his adoptive city; his legacy of either providing support to or directly funding Cleveland projects and parks is widely felt today.

The building had been abandoned since the early 2020s; it was purchased by K & D Group in 2026.

== Name ==
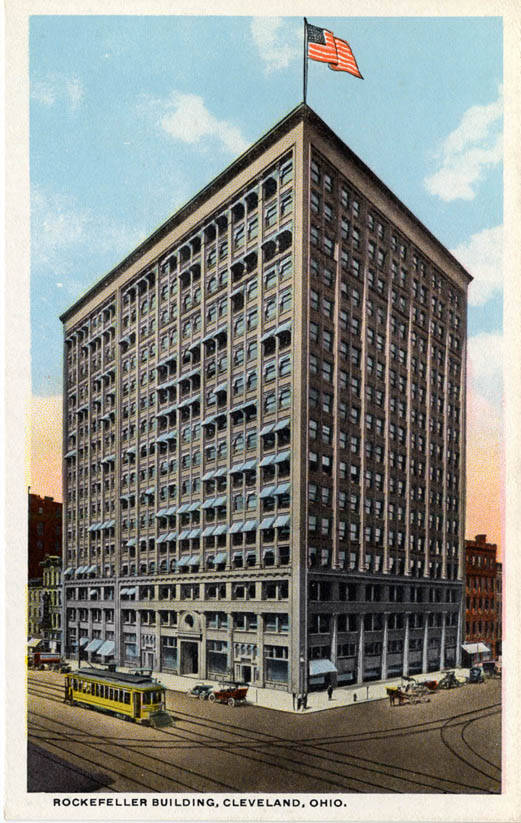
Rockefeller Building in 1913

The Rockefeller name has been prominently displayed on the West 6th side of the building since 1905, except for a brief period when fellow Cleveland businessman Josiah Kirby (responsible for starting the gigantic Cleveland Discount Company mortgage firm in 1921 in Cleveland) bought the skyscraper from the Rockefellers in 1920 and subsequently changed the facade to the Kirby Building. However, Josiah Kirby angered the Rockefeller family by doing so. Thus, the Rockefeller family bought the building back and reverted it to the Rockefeller moniker in 1923. The signage is still quite visible today, having changed little in design since 1923.

== See also ==
- List of tallest buildings in Cleveland, Ohio
