= Masumi Hayashi (photographer) =

American photographer and artist

- Born: September 3, 1945; Rivers, Arizona, United States
- Died: August 17, 2006 (aged 60); Cleveland, Ohio, United States
- Education: Florida State University; UCLA
- Occupations: Artist and educator
- Known for: Wide-format photomontages (Panoramic photo-collage)

Masumi Hayashi (September 3, 1945 – August 17, 2006) was an American photographer and artist who taught art at Cleveland State University, in Cleveland, Ohio, for 24 years. She won a Cleveland Arts Prize; three Ohio Arts Council awards; a Fulbright fellowship; awards from National Endowment for the Arts, Arts Midwest, and Florida Arts Council; as well as a 1997 Civil Liberties Educational Fund research grant.

Dr. Hayashi created a large body of fine art "panoramic photo-collage" or photo collage involving shots taken on a tripod in successive rings, and later assembled as a more-or-less than 360 degree view. Of the over 200 pieces she created in this format, primary subject matter generally fit into the following series: WWII internment camps of Americans of Japanese ancestry, post-industrial landscapes, EPA Superfund sites, abandoned prisons, war and military sites, commissions, city works, and sacred architectures. In 2004, she launched Masumimuseum.com, which is now an online archive of her work.

Hayashi's works are represented in the International Center of Photography (NYC), Tokyo Metropolitan Museum of Photography, San Francisco Museum of Modern Art, Los Angeles County Museum of Art, Berkeley Art Museum and Pacific Film Archive the Cleveland Museum of Art, the George Eastman House in Rochester, New York, the Columbus Museum of Art, the Victoria and Albert Museum in London, and the Ludwig Forum for International Art in Koblenz, Germany. In 2007, the Akron Art Museum, the Cleveland State University Art Gallery, the Museum of Contemporary Art Cleveland, and Spaces mounted major exhibitions to salute her work showing, " . . . how her work is a profound meditation on racial discrimination, on war and violence, on man's exploitation of nature and on Hayashi's search as a practicing Buddhist for spirituality and peace." In 2015, The Galleries at CSU (Cleveland State University) presented a retrospective of its former faculty member, "Place and Vision: The Artistic Legacy of Masumi Hayashi," curated by Michael Gentile.

== Biography ==
Masumi Hayashi was born to Tomio and Sakae Hayashi, in 1945 in the Gila River War Relocation Camp in Rivers, Arizona, one of the United States government's War Relocation Authority camps, where Japanese-Americans were placed in internment during World War II following the signing of Executive Order 9066. The Gila River camp was in the Gila River Indian Reservation.

Masumi was the fourth of six children and she grew up in the Watts neighborhood of Los Angeles, California and graduated from Jordan High School. As an adolescent, she worked at her parents’ store, Village Market, on Compton Avenue. She attended UCLA and later went on to attend Florida State University in Tallahassee, where she earned a bachelor's degree in 1975 and Master of Fine Arts degree in 1977.

Hayashi joined the faculty of Cleveland State University as Assistant Professor of Photography in 1982, and became a full professor in 1996. During her tenure at CSU, she received numerous awards, including an Arts Midwest, NEA fellowship in 1987, a Civil Liberties Educational Fund research fellowship in 1997, a Fulbright Grant in 2003, and Individual Artist Fellowships from the Ohio Arts Council on three occasions. She was awarded the Cleveland Arts Prize for Visual Arts in 1994.

Her work and perspective were influenced and shaped by her experiences as a Japanese-American woman, who was a Buddhist. This played a major role on her artistic themes and subject choices.

Masumi Hayashi is perhaps best known for creating striking panoramic photocollages. A unique technic she first developed in 1985, during an artist residency, using smaller color photographs (typically 4-by-6-inch prints) like tiles in a mosaic. Many of these large panoramic pieces involve more than one hundred smaller photographic prints; the rotational scope of the assembled collage can be 360 degrees or even 540 degrees. Much of her work explores socially uncomfortable spaces, including prisons, relocation camps, and Superfund cleanup sites. Later in her career, her artwork reflected a deep interest in sacred sites, and she traveled several times to India and other places in Asia, to photograph spiritually significant spaces.

== Death ==
On August 17, 2006, Masumi Hayashi and her neighbor, the 51-year-old artist and sculptor John Jackson were shot to death by Jacob Cifelli, a 29-year-old neighbor in their apartment building on Detroit Avenue in Cleveland's Detroit-Shoreway neighborhood, after she had complained to Cifelli about his loud music, which she had endured, and complained about, for months. Jackson (who also worked as a maintenance man at the apartment complex) was slain while attempting to assist Hayashi after she was shot. Cefili received a life sentence for the murders. She is survived by a son, Dean Keesey of Oakland; a daughter, Lisa Takata; a brother, Seigo; and four sisters: Connie, Amy, Nancy, and Joanne.
