= Nine-Twelve District =

Business district in Cleveland, Ohio, US

Coordinates: 41°29′58″N 81°41′9″W

The Nine-Twelve District is a major area of downtown Cleveland, in the U.S. state of Ohio, that is the re-branding of the former Financial District of Cleveland. This re-branding has largely been championed by the Downtown Cleveland Alliance. The name refers to the two major commercial avenues between which the district lies, East 9th Street and East 12th Street, with Lakeside Avenue and Euclid Avenue serving as the northern and southern boundaries, respectively. This revamping and reboot of the Cleveland Central Business District has occurred because property and business owners demanded more investment in the central area. The district is home to the newly expanded Cuyahoga County Headquarters.

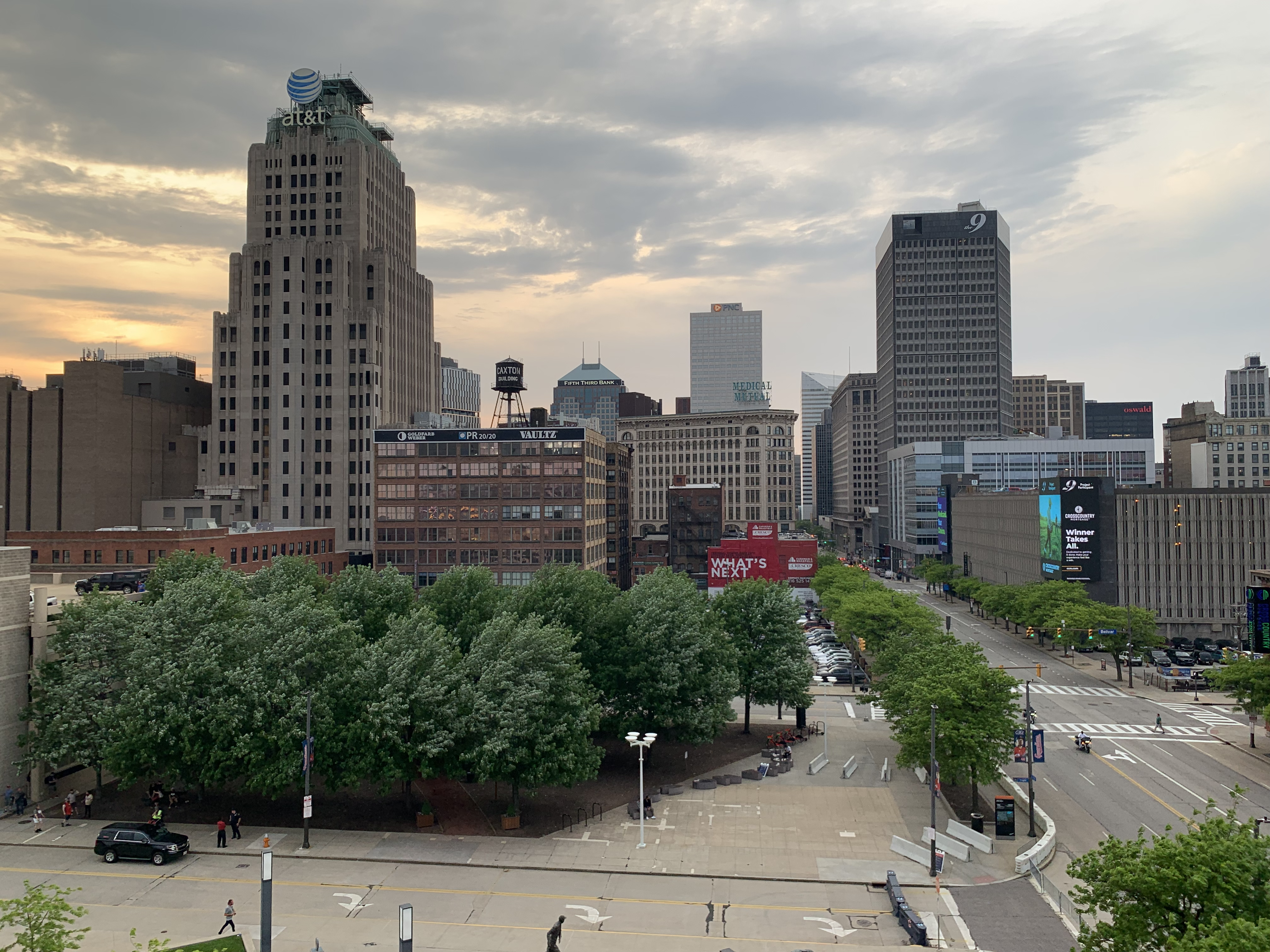
Downtown Cleveland and East 9th Street

Part of this re-branding of the area has been Walnut Wednesdays and the success of this has attracted over 1,000 people to the side street in the Nine-Twelve with its assortment of food trucks and office-worker lunch-break social events. This has in turn led to growing investment in the small area. This can be seen in the rehabbing of The 9 Cleveland into the Metropolitan Hotel and Heinen's Fine Foods opening a store in the old Swetland Building. The effort of the Downtown Cleveland Alliance has also led to an increase in the occupancy of downtown buildings and the refurbishing of old office buildings into residential properties; this is exemplified by the 1717 East Ninth Building, the Statler Arms Apartments and the renovation of the Schofield Building into a high-end Kimpton boutique hotel.

The next big question for the district is how to re-envision the largely vacant The 925 Building as Columbus-based Huntington Bank has by now moved to 200 Public Square into the former BP Tower. This has led to one of the largest office spaces in downtown being redeveloped. When completed, the building will house a mixture of retail, residential, and commercial square footage. This plan was spearheaded by South Florida developer Andrew "Avi" Greenbaum.

== Major Office Buildings Located in District ==
- 1100 Superior
- 1111 Superior
- AECOM Building
- Ameritech Center
- AmTrust Financial Center
- the Athelon, formerly the Cleveland Athletic Club
- Citizens Bank Financial Center
- IMG Center
- North Point Tower
- Ohio Savings Plaza
- One Cleveland Center
- PNC Center
- Rose Building
- Superior Building
- Tower at Erieview

== See also ==
- Downtown Cleveland
- List of tallest buildings in Cleveland
