= Cleveland Trust Company Building =

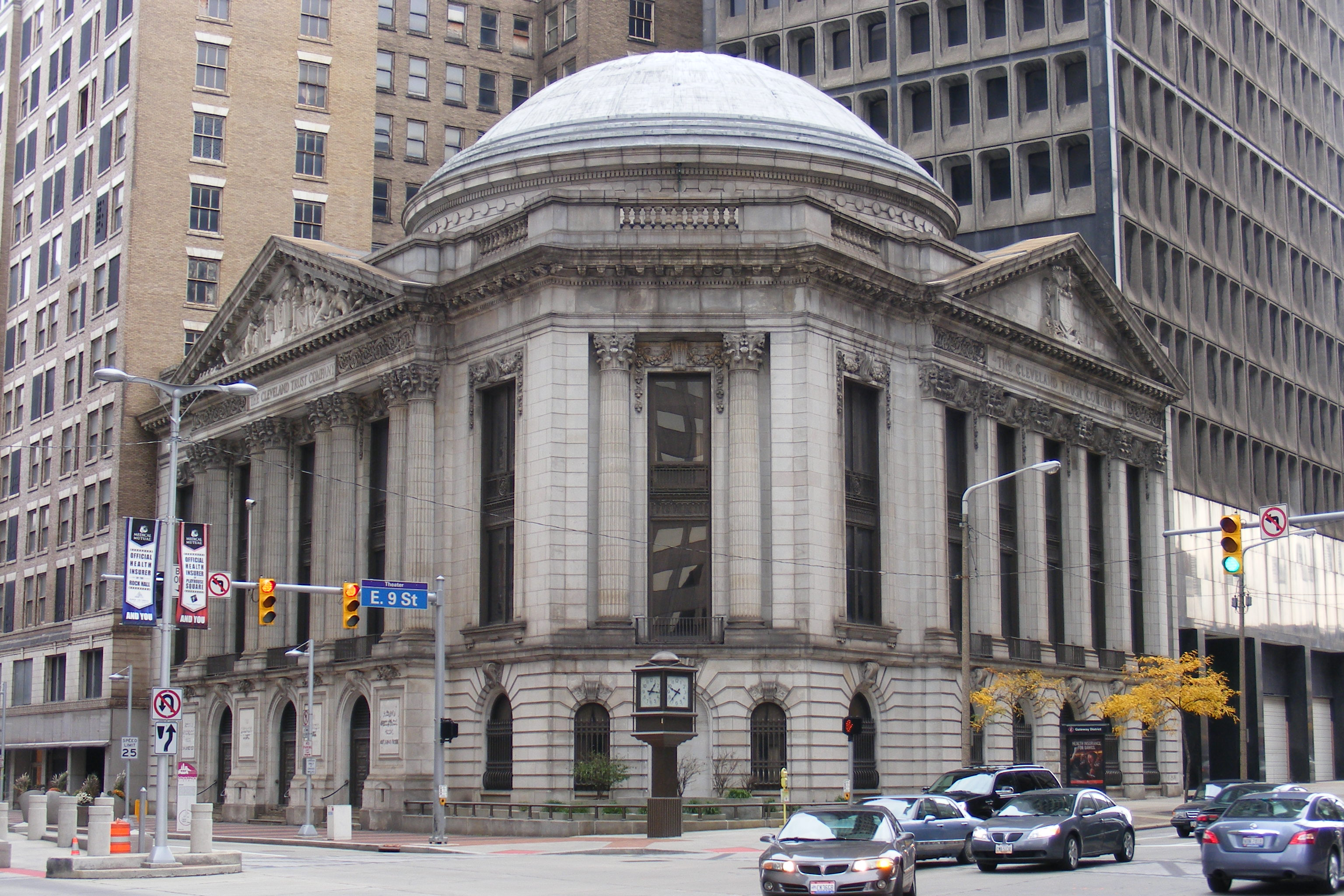
- Cleveland Trust Company on East 9th Street and Euclid Avenue
- Interactive map of the Cleveland Trust Company Building area

General information
- Status: Completed
- Location: Cleveland, Ohio, U.S.
- Coordinates: 41.50004°N 81.68612°W
- Completed: December 28, 1907

Height
- Antenna spire: 93 ft (28 m)

Technical details
- Floor count: 4 (including basement)
- Cleveland Trust Company
- U.S. National Register of Historic Places
- Area: less than one acre
- Built: 1905–1907
- Architect: George B. Post
- Architectural style: Beaux-Arts, Neoclassical, and Renaissance Revival
- NRHP reference No.: 73001410
- Added to NRHP: November 26, 1973

The Cleveland Trust Company Building is a 1907 building designed by George B. Post and located at the intersection of East 9th Street and Euclid Avenue in downtown Cleveland's Nine-Twelve District. The building is a mix of Beaux-Arts, Neoclassical, and Renaissance Revival architectural styles. It features a glass-enclosed rotunda, a tympanum sculpture, and interior murals.

In 1910, the Chicago school-style, 13-story Swetland Building was built adjacent to the east of the Cleveland Trust Company Building. In 1971, the Brutalist-style, 29-story Cleveland Trust Tower was built adjacent to the south of the Cleveland Trust Company Building. The Cleveland Trust Company Building underwent a significant interior renovation from 1972 to 1973, but closed to the public in 1996. Cuyahoga County purchased all three structures as part of the "Ameritrust complex" in 2005. In 2013, the Cleveland Trust Company Building was sold to the Geis Cos., which renovated it (and part of the Swetland Building) into a grocery store. The basement area of the former bank became a bar and nightclub. Much, although not all, of the Cleveland Trust Company Building's original interior architectural and interior design elements have been retained.

The Cleveland Trust Building was added to the National Register of Historic Places in 1973.

== Background ==
Cleveland Trust Company was founded in 1894, and was one of the first banks in Cleveland to have branch locations. Cleveland Trust merged with the Western Reserve Trust Co. in 1903, and by 1905 had outgrown the space it rented for its headquarters. The bank decided to construct a building which would be large enough to serve as its headquarters for years to come. Bank officers also settled on the Neoclassical architectural style, a common choice for banks at the time because it gave banking an air of grandeur and prestige.

=== Buying the land and picking the architect ===
In 1901, the Cleveland Trust Company had purchased two properties at the corner of Euclid Avenue and E. 9th Street as an investment. One was the First Methodist Church building and land, which it obtained in April 1901 for $500,000 ($19,350,000 in 2025 dollars). The second was the Wedge Building and land, obtained for $100,000 at the same time and as part of the First Methodist purchase. Under the terms of the purchase agreement, title to the land would not be turned over to the Cleveland Trust until 1904. The purchaser of both properties was Charles Lathrop Pack, president of the Cleveland Chamber of Commerce. But Pack was merely the agent for the Cleveland Trust Company. Pack often served as the go-between in these types of investments so that wealthy investors wouldn't be gouged once sellers knew the identity of the purchaser. By 1904, Cleveland Trust officials had decided that this land would be a good location for their new, permanent headquarters.

In 1904, the Cleveland Trust Company invited architects from around the nation to participate in a competition to design the headquarters building it intended to build on the First Methodist/Wedge land. In November of that year, the company selected New York City-based architect George B. Post to design the structure. Post was a nationally known architect whose works included the New York World Building (1890), then the world's tallest building; the Manufactures and Liberal Arts Building at the World's Columbian Exposition (1893), the Bronx Borough Hall in The Bronx, New York (1897); and the New York Stock Exchange Building (1903). Post was already known in Cleveland for designing the Williamson Building (1900), an 18-story office building on Public Square.

=== Construction ===
Salvage work on the existing buildings began in April 1905, and demolition of them in May. Demolition was halfway complete by June 18. By this time, Post's plans for the new bank building envisioned the bank itself taking up half the block, with an office building or trade center taking up the rest. The Cleveland Trust contracted with John Gill & Sons, a Cleveland construction firm, to build the new structure. Ground was broken on December 9, 1905, and construction was estimated to last 400 days. The estimated cost of the structure was $600,000 ($21,500,000 in 2025 dollars).

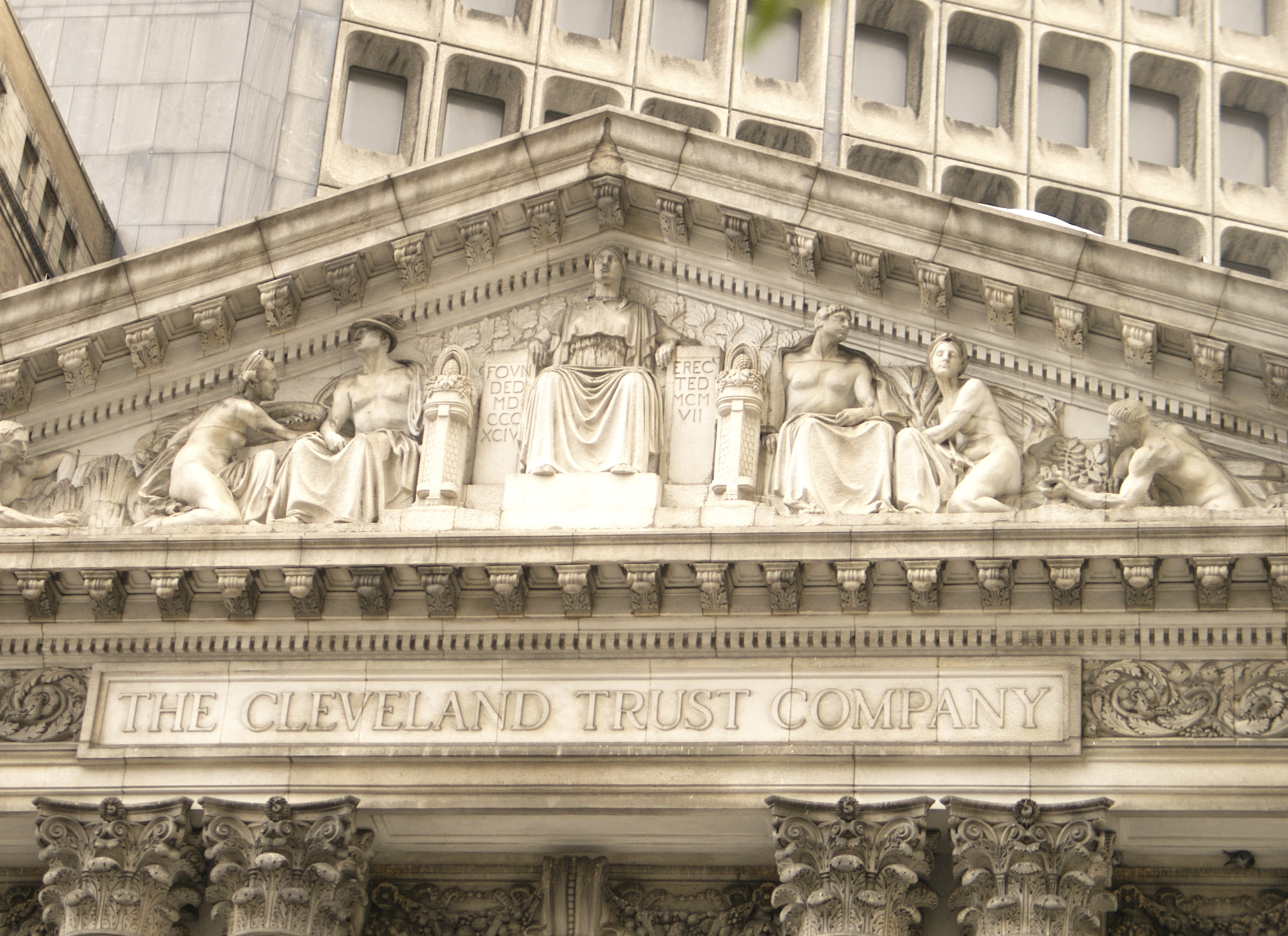
Finance, the building's main entrance tympanum sculpture by Karl Bitter.

Construction on the building continued throughout 1906. Several serious accidents occurred at the construction site. On January 25, 46-year-old bricklayer Steven Johnson fell from scaffolding and fractured his skull and wrist. Engineer G.A. Donsee had his left leg crushed on June 19 when a 40-foot (12 m) high derrick fell on him. The third accident resulted in a fatality, when workman William Crouch died after being struck in head by falling debris on August 25.

In April 1907, the builders estimated that the structure would be finished by November 1. But construction delays prevented the building from being completed until December 28, 1907. The Cleveland Trust Company occupied its new headquarters on January 1, 1908. The final cost of the structure had also risen substantially, to $1 million ($34,553,571 in 2025 dollars).

== About the original building ==
When completed, the four-story Cleveland Trust Company Building was the third largest bank building in the United States. It was also the first building ever built in downtown Cleveland exclusively for the use of a bank. The below-ground floor contained a 200-short-ton (180 t) bank vault with a 17-short-ton (15 t) door. It was the largest bank vault in Ohio at the time.

At the time of its completion, the building's architectural style was described as Renaissance Revival. The Plain Dealer architectural critic Angela Chatman agreed with that assessment in 1989, as did The Plain Dealer architecture critic Steven Litt in 2006, historian Sharon Gregor in 2010, and Crain's Cleveland Business magazine in 2015. However, in 1991 historian Jan Cigliano Hartman called the building a mix of Beaux-Arts, Neoclassical, and Renaissance Revival styles. Architect Marcel Breuer described it in 1967 as Neoclassical, and Litt described it as such in 1997. But architect Carl J. Stein said in 2010 that it was more properly Beaux-Arts. Litt changed his assessment of the structure's style to Beaux-Arts as well in 2013. (Note: An unsigned article in The Plain Dealer in February 2015 also described the building as Beaux-Arts.)

The building was widely praised, then and now, as "an ingenious solution to problems posed by an irregular site".

=== Exterior and superstructure ===
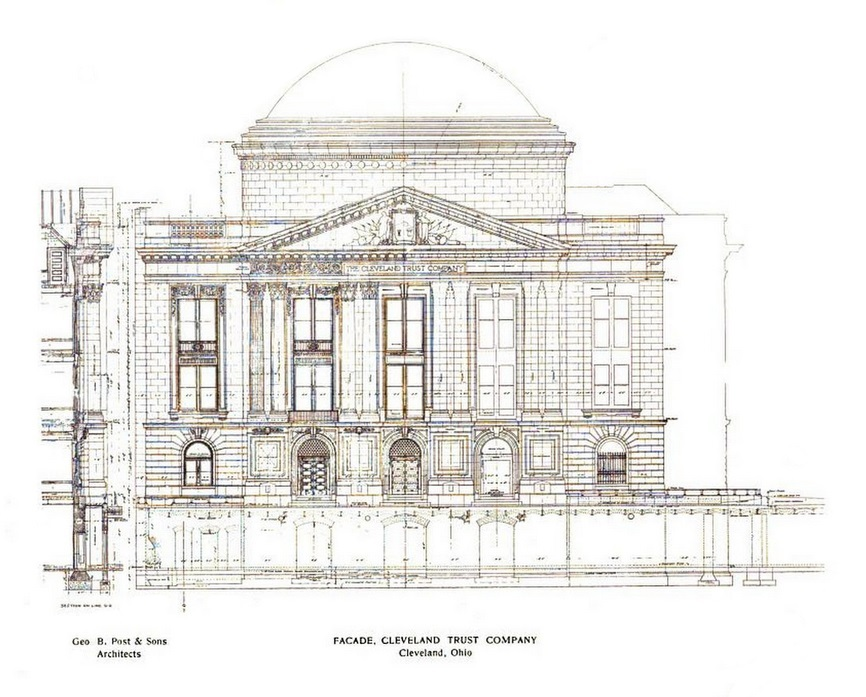
Architectural drawing of the E. 9th Street facade of the building.

The exterior of the structure is made of white granite from the North Jay Granite Company, and quarried near Jay, Maine. The site is not square, due to the acute angle at which Euclid Avenue intersects with E. 9th Street. To accommodate the site, Post created a total of 13 bays and columns on each street-facing side of the structure. There is a bay aligned with the axis of each entrance, and with the street corner of the building. Although a portico had been planned for the main entrance, the site was too small to permit one. The Euclid Avenue columns support a tympanum which is filled with the sculpture Finance. On the Euclid Avenue side are eight Corinthian columns, behind which are five two-story windows. On the E. 9th Street side, there are six pilasters, six two-story windows, and a mostly empty tympanum featuring an eagle and shield. Massive bronze doors are featured at both the Euclid Avenue and E. 9th Street entrances. The exterior walls are solid granite, unsupported by any other structure. The corner is chamfered to provide a transition between the two planes of the building.

Thirteen steel columns, arranged in a circle in the center of the building, support the dome overhead. The columns are irregularly spaced to accommodate building's site and avoid blocking entrances. Horizontal steel beams run outward from these columns to the outer walls, supporting the upper floors. Each of the columns was coated in a thick layer of plaster, with vertical conduits and air ducts embedded and hidden in the plaster. On the first floor, the plaster-coasted columns were clad in marble, but merely painted on the second and third floors. Each of the upper floors was constructed with a concrete base, on top of which were placed brick and red tile arched supports. A wood floor was constructed atop the arched supports, and in parts of the second floor marble tile was laid atop the wood flooring. Intricate embossed bronze brackets supported the second-floor balcony. The first floor ceiling, formed by the second floor balcony, was decorated with highly detailed bronze coffers.

=== Exterior sculpture ===
Some time in 1906, the Cleveland Trust Company hired sculptor Karl Bitter to design and carve an appropriate work for the triangular tympanum over the Euclid Avenue entrance. Bitter was well on his way to finishing the design in January 1907, with carving to begin in the spring. Seven assistants worked on the 11-by-56-foot (3.4 by 17.1 m) sculpture, with Bitter supervising the roughing out but doing the final sculpting himself.

The work was unveiled on October 8, 1907. Titled Finance, (Note: Finance is the name used at the time of the sculpture's completion. More recently, The Plain Dealer has used the name The Mainsprings of Wealth.) it depicted a female goddess of commerce and finance seated on a throne, while other gods bring her the products of land and sea to sell. (Note: Bitter told Ohio Architect and Builder magazine in 1908 that the sculpture is an allegory for wealth. The tympanum is divided into halves, one half representing the traditional "fruits of the land" and the other half the "fruits of the sea". The central figure depicts the exchange of goods and the accumulation of wealth (e.g., banking). Three figures occupy the "land" segment: From left to right, Mining, Agriculture, and Labor (closest to the center). Three figures occupy the "sea" segment: From left to right, Commerce (closest to the center), Navigation, and Fishery. Animals typical of land and sea fill in the corners of the work. The central figure is seated on a throne. The dates of the founding of the bank, and the erection of the building, are inscribed on the throne. Visible behind the goddess to the left and right are altars laden with fruit symbolizing the nation and the industriousness of its citizens.) The work was considered a turning point in Bitter's career, when he matured from an over-reliance on classicism and began developing his own style.

A sculptural work by Bitter, depicting the company's coat of arms, adorns the 9th Street tympanum.

=== Dome ===
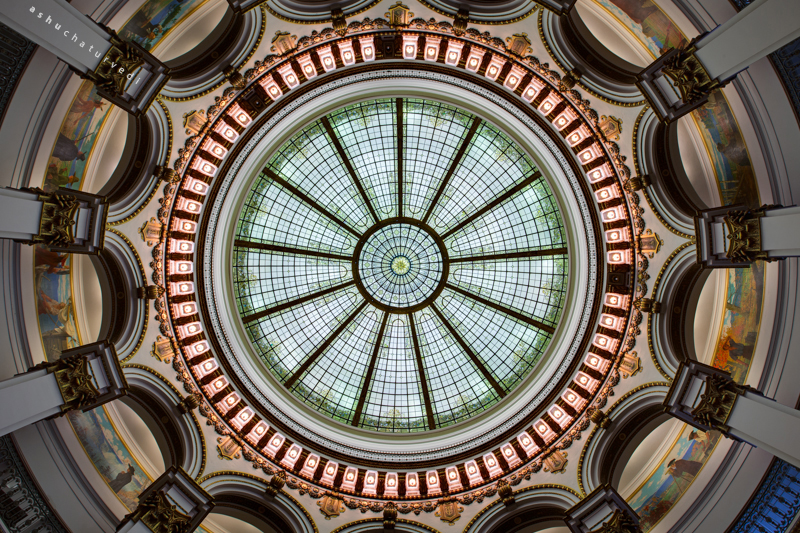
Stained-glass dome and drum murals inside the rotunda of the building.

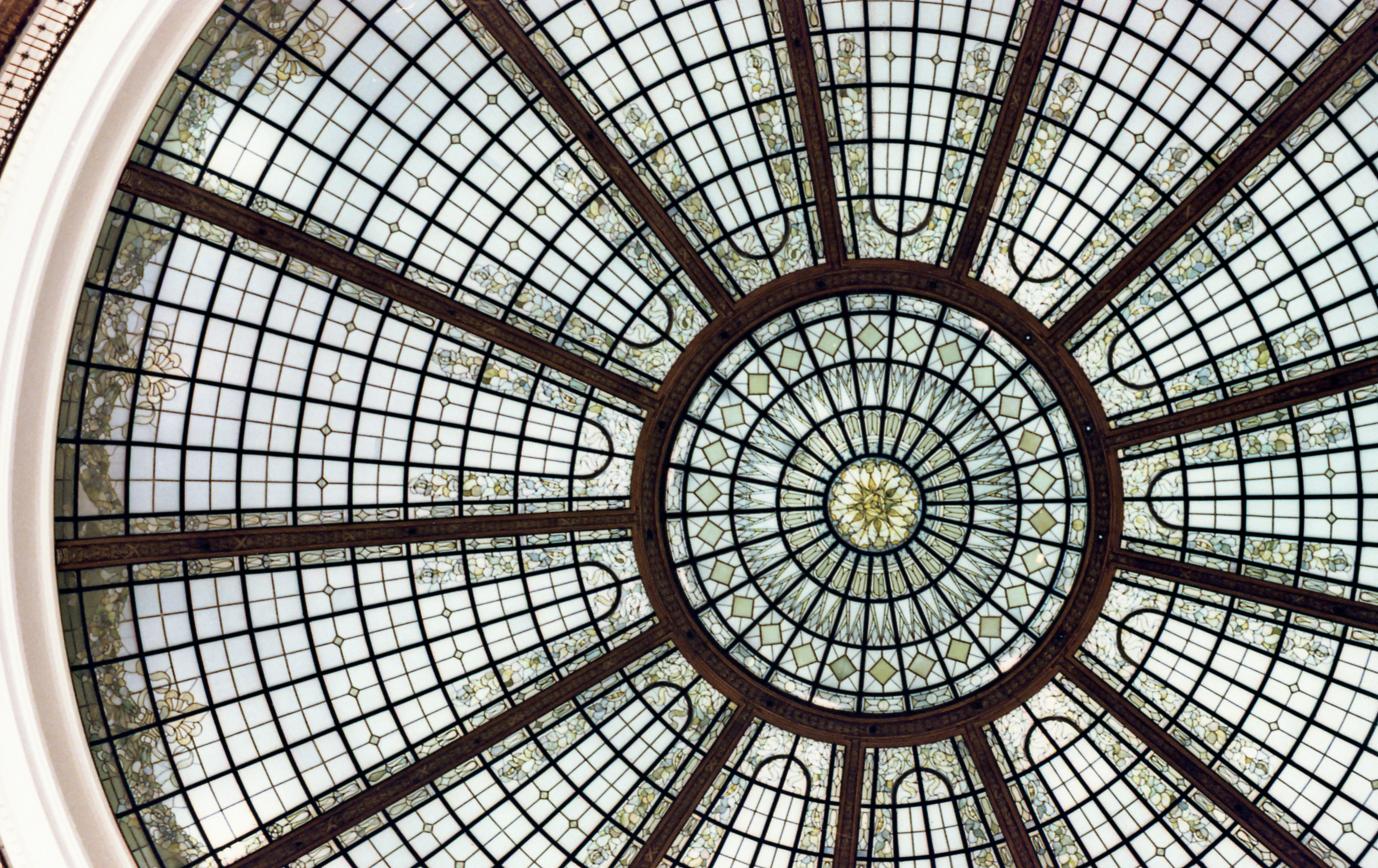
Inside the Cleveland Trust Company Building looking up at the dome.

The Cleveland Trust Company asked Post to design an interior that was simple, a concept in line with the idea that a savings bank is about economy. The interior is dominated by an 85-foot (26 m) high, 61-foot (19 m) wide concrete rotunda which illuminates three of four lower floors. The rotunda's dome has an unusual number of segments (13), due to the acute angle of the building site. Embedded in the gold gilt concrete frames of the dome are numerous panels of stained lead glass. The double-paned glass panels depict an intricate, repetitive, green and yellow floral pattern. A series of small lights, set in bronze rosettes, illuminated the dome from below at night.

Some sources claim that the stained glass was designed and manufactured by Louis Comfort Tiffany and his firm in New York City. Historians Sharon Gregor and G. E. Kidder Smith, however, say it is only in the style of Tiffany. Sandvick Architects, consultant to the Geis Cos. on the renovation, said in 2013 that there was no documentary evidence to attribute the dome to Tiffany. In 2016, historic preservationist Karl Brunjes discovered extensive evidence that the designer was Nicola D'Ascenzo, a Philadelphia-based artist whose works include stained glass at the Cathedral of St. John the Divine and Riverside Church in New York City and Folger Shakespeare Library and Washington National Cathedral in Washington, D.C.

To protect the stained glass dome, a dome of wire-mesh reinforced glass was installed 15 feet (4.6 m) above the inner dome.

=== Rotunda ===
The rotunda stands above a five-sided room. Each of the walls in the room are of a different size. The interior walls of the rotunda were finished in white marble and bronze capitals, light fixtures, railings, and other elements. (Note: The ornamental bronze gas and electrical light fixtures were designed and manufactured by The Mitchell Vance Company of New York City.) The floor of the rotunda was open space, with oak-panelled offices and teller windows against the walls. The interior also featured columns clad in white marble, and the drum supporting the dome was decorated with carved marble garlands, dyed in pastel colors and gilded with bronze. An elaborate molded plaster frieze depicting bags of money, attorney's seals, and keys also ran around the inside of the drum.

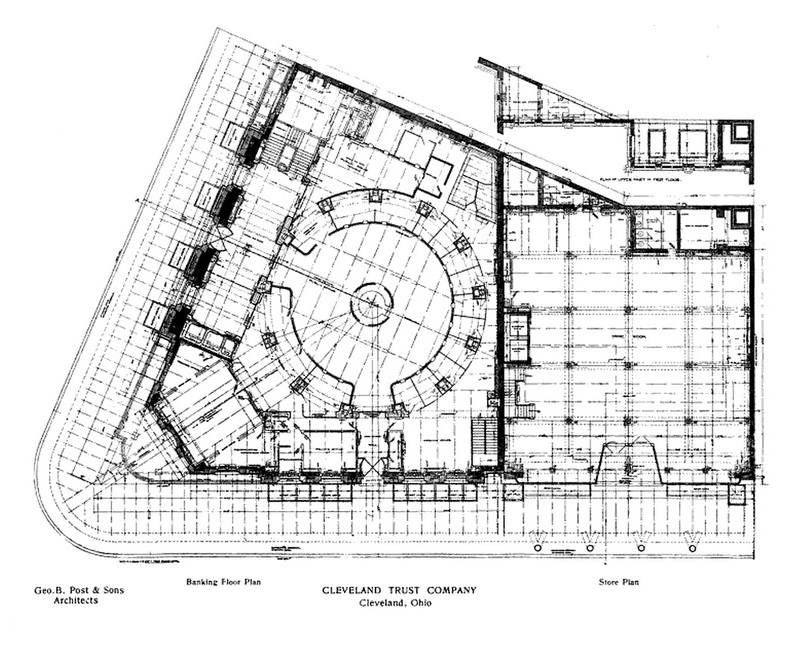
First floor plan of the building, showing unbuilt retail space to the south (right in this image).

The main entrance on Euclid Avenue led to a foyer which contained both elevators and stairs to the upper floors. (Note: The ornamental bronze railing for the staircase was designed and manufactured by W.S. Tyler & Sons of Cleveland.) Doors from the foyer led to the main rotunda, executive offices (right), and the women's parlor (left). The first floor contained executive offices, tellers' windows, and a parlor where only women customers were permitted, to allow them to do their banking in private. This space had walls of mahogany and fabric-covered panels. The tellers' windows featured bronze grilles and marble counters. The floor was Italian marble, and in the center of the floor was a 6-foot (1.8 m) wide bronze seal. Designed and sculpted by Victor David Brenner and cast by the Jno. Williams, Inc. foundry of New York City, the work featured the bank's name, a bag of money, a key, and an attorney's seal—all symbols of banking. The main floor also had a vault for the storage of cash, which was located to the rear of the building opposite the main Euclid Avenue entrance.

The second floor (which had 12-foot (3.7 m) high ceilings) contained offices for the company's bond and trust departments, and the bank's accounting department. There was also an employee cloakroom on the second floor with a cast terrazzo counter. This floor was open to the rotunda space, with the balconies made of white marble and the balusters and railings made of bronze. The third floor contained additional office space, including that for top bank executives such as the president. The fourth floor contained the advertising department, a kitchen, and a small employee dining room.

=== Basement and vaults ===
The basement was divided into three concentric circles. The inner circle contained the main vault, storage vaults, and safe deposit box vault. The middle circle was a 6-foot (1.8 m) wide access corridor, framed by walls of building tile (a predecessor to concrete block). The access corridor contained conduits, ducts, and pipes for the heating, mechanical, and ventilation systems of the building. A portion of the basement extended under Euclid Avenue. The basement also contained a board of directors meeting room, a vault for storing bank records, an employee locker room, parlors for customers' use, and coupon rooms. Except for the access corridor, floors in the basement were marble.

The bank had four vaults: The main vault, safe deposit box vault, and storage vaults for fur clothing and household silver. The main vault was 16-by-20-foot (4.9 by 6.1 m) in size. Its walls were structural steel plate ("armor"), encased in 20 inches (51 cm) of concrete. The steel was provided by the Carnegie Steel Company. The vault door was manufactured by the L. H. Miller Safe and Iron Works of Baltimore.

=== Murals ===
The drum of the building was supported by arches supported by the interior columns. The tympanum framed by these arches were decorated by murals designed and painted by Francis David Millet.

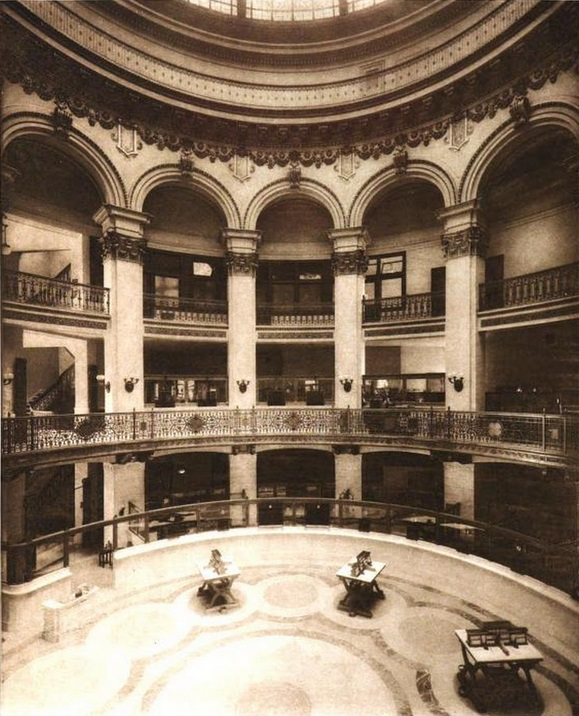
1909 photograph of the interior of the Cleveland Trust Company Building.

The Cleveland Trust Company hired Millet some time in the fall of 1908. (Note: Millet had provided the murals for Post's Manufactures and Liberal Arts Building at the World's Columbian Exposition.) Millet sketched out various designs for the murals until he developed a design he liked. Then a full-size "cartoon" (black and white line drawing) of the sketch was put in place in the tympanum to ensure that the design worked visually. After adjusting the design as needed, Millet sketched and then painted 13 smaller versions of the murals, each of them about 18 inches (46 cm) in height and 3 to 4 feet (0.91 to 1.22 m) in width. (Note: These small draft murals were retained by the Cleveland Trust Company and its successor corporations, and stored in the Cleveland Trust Company Building's vault. They were rediscovered in early 2015.) Work on the draft paintings at Millet's Forest Hill studio in the Georgetown neighborhood of Washington, D.C., was under way by at least late March 1909. The completed draft murals were displayed at the Washington Architectural Club exhibit at the Corcoran Gallery of Art in Washington, D.C., in early May 1909.

These small paintings were scaled up and transferred to manila paper using charcoal sticks. These scaled-up versions were corrected (if needed), and restudied in place in the tympanum. By late May, Millet was still at work adjusting the murals and finishing the final drafts. Work on the murals was complete by June 5, 1909. Millet put the completed murals on display at his Forest Hill studio for a week beginning on June 10, 1909. During this time, they were viewed by President William Howard Taft, various officials of the federal government, and members of the diplomatic corps. The final works were again transferred to manila paper using charcoal sticks, and the manila drawings used to transfer the design to canvas which was then affixed to the wall. Millet and three assistants spent a year transferring Millet's designs to the walls, work which was completed in late December 1909 or early January 1910.

Titled The Development of Civilization in America, the paintings include: "The Norse Discoverers", "The Puritans", "Exploration By Land", "LaSalle on Lake Erie", "Father Hennepin at Niagara Falls", "Exploration By Water", "Migration", "Buying Land From the Indians", "Surveying the Site of Cleveland", "Felling the Timber", "Building the Log Cabin", "Plowing the Clearing", and "Gathering the Harvest". Each mural was 15.5 by 4.5 feet (4.7 by 1.4 m) in size. To ensure that the paintings could be seen from the ground floor 40 feet (12 m) below, Millet designed them to be simple, with broad fields of deep blue, deep green, and bright red. Each mural used the same color scheme, and the horizon line in each mural aligns with the horizon line in the adjacent murals.

=== Power plant and mechanical systems ===
An office and retail structure, the Swetland Building, was erected on Euclid Avenue next to the Cleveland Trust Company Building. A power plant, capable of providing the electrical needs for the bank next door, was located in the basement of the Swetland Building and accessible by a tunnel leading from the basement of the Cleveland Trust building.

A pneumatic tube system ran throughout the Cleveland Trust Company Building, connecting tellers to bookkeepers and each department. A telautograph was also located in each department. This device enabled a handwritten message to be reproduced at the receiving station. The building also had 76 telephones (quite a large number for the era), and two private telephone exchanges in the building to accommodate telephone traffic. The building also had a central vacuum cleaner system and a primitive air conditioning system known as "artificial ventilation" were built into the plaster-coated columns.

== History ==
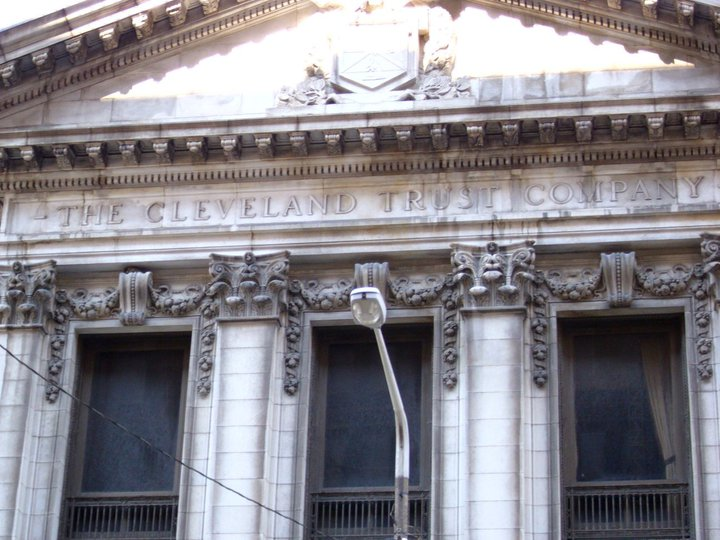
East 9th Street entrance and tympanum to the Cleveland Trust Company Building.

In 1910, the Swetland family, major real estate developers in downtown Cleveland, built the Swetland Building (at 1010 Euclid Avenue) adjacent to the Cleveland Trust Company Building. The building was 13 stories tall and Chicago school architectural style.

In September 1919, the Cleveland Trust Company proposed building an 11-story tower atop the Cleveland Trust Company Building. The bank hired George B. Post to design the tower, but it was never built.

The exterior of the Cleveland Trust Company Building became increasingly dirty in its first 55 years, but calls by the news media to clean the structure were largely ignored by the bank. The building underwent its first exterior cleaning (a type of abrasive blasting) in July 1964. The exterior was cleaned again in mid-1971 using a chemical (rather than abrasive) process. The exterior of the building was then coated with a resin which gave the building a slight cream color.

In 1967, the Cleveland Trust Company announced plans to build an office tower on E. 9th Street adjacent to the Cleveland Trust Company Building. Known as the Cleveland Trust Tower, the 29-story office tower was designed by architect Marcel Breuer in the Brutalist architectural style and completed in October 1971. A new passageway connected the basement of the Cleveland Trust Company Building with the new tower. Two and a half months after announcing its plans to build the tower, the Cleveland Trust Company purchased the Swetland Building from the Shaker Savings Association for $2.5 million ($24,139,222 in 2025 dollars). (Note: The Shaker Savings Association, a bank based in Shaker Heights, Ohio, purchased the Swetland Building from the Swetland family in 1959.) In December 1967, the Cleveland Trust Company said it planned to demolish the Swetland Building and build a second 29-story tower on the site, with a connecting structure that would wrap around the rear of the Trust Building. But no demolition took place, and the second tower was never built because the bank's growth slowed and it no longer needed the space.

=== 1972-1973 renovation ===
On January 13, 1972, the Cleveland Trust Company Building was closed to the public in preparation for a major renovation. The renovation and refurbishment was designed by architect Montgomery Orr of the architectural firm of Frazier, Orr, Fairbanks, and Quam. Turner Construction was the general contractor, while Hoag-Wismer-Henderson Associates were the structural engineers. The outer wire-glass dome was covered with an opaque weatherproofing material, and the murals and the inner dome lit with an artificial lighting system designed by General Electric. The inner dome, which had a number of loose panes and was missing others, was repaired and regilded.

All the offices on the upper floors were removed, and new, larger offices installed. These ranged in size from 5,600 square feet (520 m^{2}) to 8,900 square feet (830 m^{2}) in size. The flooring and arched supports on the upper levels were removed, and replaced with 1.5-inch (3.8 cm) Styrofoam blocks which were covered with a thin layer of concrete. The women's parlor and the tellers' cages were removed, but the tellers' cage bronze grilles were salvaged and reused for the new tellers' counters. The marble floor was retained, as were the embossed bronze brackets, and all gold leaf and gilt inside the rotunda repaired and cleaned. The clear glass of the large windows on Euclid Avenue and E. 9th Street were replaced with smoked glass.

A modern air conditioning system was installed in the building, and the heating, lighting, plumbing, and telephone systems all upgraded. During the mechanical renovations, the old pneumatic tube, telautograph, central vacuum, and "artificial ventilation" systems were all rediscovered.

Cleveland Trust Company officials said they hoped to have the renovation completed by March 1973. The building reopened on April 27, 1973.

=== Closure ===
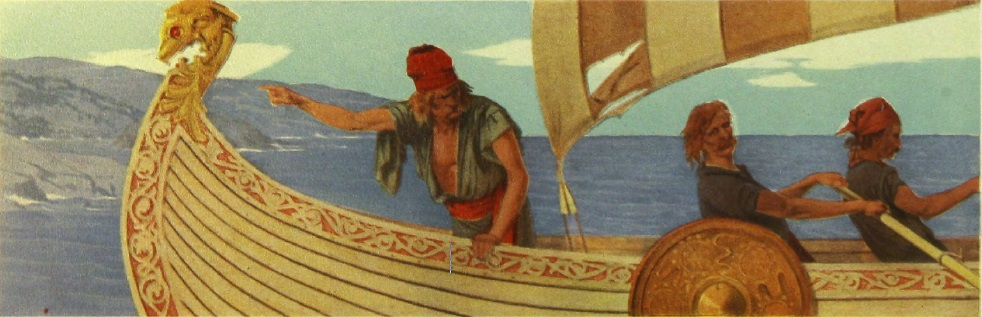
"The Norse Discoverers", the first of 13 murals painted by F.D. Millet for the rotunda.

The former Cleveland Trust Company merged with Society National Bank in 1991, and Key Bank of Albany, New York, merged Society National Bank in 1993. The new company was called KeyCorp and headquartered in Cleveland.

The Richard E. Jacobs Group had constructed Society Center for Society National Bank. The 57-story skyscraper, Cleveland's tallest building, opened in January 1992. In February 1996, KeyCorp leased eight floors in the McDonald Investment Center and three floors at Society Center, but agreed to pay for all the operational costs at Society Center. On March 8, 1996, the Jacobs Group acquired the Cleveland Trust Company Building for $10. KeyCorp agreed to the extremely low purchase price because it had assumed control of Society Center. Society Center was renamed Key Tower on March 20, With all banking operations now centralized in Key Tower, the Cleveland Trust Company Building and the Cleveland Trust Tower were no longer needed. Both buildings closed in December 1996 as part of a wide-ranging closure of numerous KeyCorp branches. (Note: The safe deposit boxes were abandoned when the branch closed. Some customers cleaned out their boxes before the closure. But not all customers (or their heirs) could be reached, and many boxes remained locked—their contents still inside. Records of who owned the boxes were lost. Two keys, one owned by the bank and one by the customer, were needed to open each box. Records documenting which bank key went with which box were also lost. Most bank keys, and the few customer keys in the bank's possession, were abandoned on the floor of the safe deposit box vault. Locked boxes remained locked, even after redevelopment of the building into a bar, as a court order is required to open them.)

The building was open to the public only irregularly between 1997 and 2004. It was open for nearly a week for "Ingenuity Fest" in April 2005.

=== Cuyahoga County ownership ===
Cuyahoga County bought the Cleveland Trust Company Building, Cleveland Trust Tower, Swetland Building, and two other adjacent structures for $21.7 million ($44,674,135 in 2025 dollars) in September 2005. Initially, the county intended to turn the complex into a new home for county government. The county considered demolishing the Cleveland Trust Tower, but refused to alter the Cleveland Trust Company Building. County commissioners voted to demolish the tower in April 2006. The county hired the Cleveland architectural firm of Robert P. Madison International and the New York City-based firm of Kohn Pedersen Fox to design a replacement building for the Breuer tower. Their concept, revealed in June 2007, proposed a 15-story glass-enclosed tower that would isolate the Cleveland Trust Company Building on the corner. The county commissioners reversed their decision to demolish the tower on June 15, 2007. Meanwhile, the county spent about $13 million removing asbestos from the building and purchasing the adjacent Oppmann parking garage.

K & D Group of Willoughby, Ohio, proposed purchasing the entire complex in June 2008. It planned to turn the lower floors of the tower into a hotel and the upper floors into apartments. The Swetland Building would be demolished and a new office building erected, while the Cleveland Trust Company Building would be repurposed. The deal collapsed in July 2009 after K & D Group was unable to obtain financing for its project.

Cuyahoga County put the complex of buildings back on the market in early 2010.

In June 2014, Cuyahoga County sued former County Commissioner Jimmy Dimora, former County Auditor Frank Russo, and 10 other former officials, private developers, lawyers, and companies for recommending the Cleveland Trust complex purchase. The county claimed that Dimora, Russo, and the others conspired to have the county purchase the complex from the Jacobs Group (with whom they had a business relationship) with the intent of steering its eventual sale to associates at a lower price. The county lost $18 million on the eventual sale of the five buildings. In February 2016, Judge Patricia Cosgrove ruled that the county had waited too long to bring its complaint under a state statute of limitations law.

=== Reopening ===
In December 2012, Cuyahoga County announced that it had signed an agreement with the Geis Cos. of Streetsboro, Ohio, regarding the Cleveland Trust complex of buildings. Geis agreed to demolish the Oppmann Garage and build a 15-story office building and parking garage on the site. Cuyahoga County would lease the top eight floors of the structure. The deal also permitted Geis to purchase the Cleveland Trust complex for just $26.5 million ($37,162,995 in 2025 dollars). The purchase price was low to offset the construction costs of the new office tower. Over the next two weeks, Geis agreed to not demolish the Oppmann Garage, but the P & H Buildings just south of the Trust Tower (at the corner of E. 9th Street and Prospect Avenue). Geis modified its office tower plans, reducing the structure's height to just eight stories. It offered the county a 26-year lease on the entire structure, with the right to buy the building outright for just $1 at the end of the lease. It also increased its bid for the Cleveland Trust complex to $27 million ($37,864,183 in 2025 dollars). The Cuyahoga County Council approved the transaction, and the deal closed in February 2013. The Geis Co. won $26.9 million ($37,179,643 in 2025 dollars) in tax credits from the Ohio State Historic Preservation Office to assist in renovating the buildings. (Note: The tax credits had been won by Cuyahoga County in 2009, but public entities were not able to qualify for the credits. So the credits were transferred to the Geis Cos. after the real estate transaction was finalized.) Geis also applied for federal historic preservation tax credits and New Markets Tax Credits, both of which it won. The state award was the largest preservation tax credit ever granted by the state of Ohio at the time, and was increased in March 2014 to $31 million ($42,159,826 in 2025 dollars).

The Geis Cos. announced that the Cleveland Trust Tower, Cleveland Trust Company Building, and Swetland Building would be collectively called The 9 Cleveland. The Cleveland Trust Tower would be renovated, with the lower floors becoming a 156-room hotel and the upper floors 105 luxury apartments. The Cleveland Trust Company Building would be repurposed into a grocery store, operated by Heinen's Fine Foods (a local company). The ground floor would become part of the grocery store, while the second floor would become a café and wine shop. The third floor would be turned into offices. The ground floor of the Swetland Building would become part of Heinen's, while the upper floors would be renovated into 100 apartments. Completion of the project was set for late 2014.

Architect John Williams of Process Creative Studios of Cleveland oversaw the renovation of the rotunda and the Swetland Building's first floor into Heinen's. A number of items were salvaged from the bank rotunda and retained or repurposed during the conversion to a grocery store. In the basement, the four vaults were repurposed into a nightclub, and the iron gate which closed off the vault areas used as the main entrance to the bar. The former main vault became the Bourbon Room, which was decorated with disused safe deposit box covers and keys as well as gears from vault doors. On the second floor, the intricate bronze railing was retained, and the cast terrazzo cloakroom counter was repurposed for use by the wine shop. The marble teller's counters on the first floor were repurposed as circular tables for the café and wine shop. The marble tiles on the second floor, which at some point had been covered with carpeting, were rediscovered and reused as well. Other architectural elements were restored to close to their original beauty. The bronze brackets and coffers on the first floor had been covered, and soffits added to the second floor ceiling in 1972 to accommodate new HVAC ducts. The soffits lowered the ceiling a full 3 feet (0.91 m), obscuring the windows. The brackets and coffers were uncovered and restored, and the soffits and ductwork removed. The marble cladding on the rotunda columns and the original first floor flooring were also retained. Also retained was the bronze Cleveland Trust Company seal embedded in the floor of the ground level.

The total cost of the renovation was $10 million ($13,582,760 in 2025 dollars). The renovated building reopened on February 25, 2015. The Plain Dealer, upon the opening of the Heinen's, called the renovation "both visionary and very, very smart."

Heinen's closed the location on July 31, 2026.

== About the renovated building ==
The current Cleveland Trust Company Building is part of a complex of three buildings collectively known as The 9 Cleveland. As of 2015, the basement of the structure has been turned into a bar and nightclub known as The Vault.

A 27,000-square-foot (2,500 m^{2}) Heinen's Fine Foods grocery store occupied the building's first and second floors. On the first floor are service counters and cold storage units for serving fish, meat, poultry, and prepared food. Although standard rectilinear food service units were used, they were embedded in curvilinear counters to help them blend in with the rotunda's architecture. The counters are made of Caesarstone (a man-made material which mimics granite) and trimmed with walnut and stainless steel. Modern high-pressure HVAC systems are concealed from view behind walls or in soffits. The center of the rotunda serves as a dining area, and is occupied by small tables with chairs.

The second floor consists of a large wine and craft beer shop, with a café area for beverage tasting. The vault on the first floor was repurposed as an office for the store.

The third floor contains offices for the grocery store and The 9 Cleveland.

== Popular culture ==
- The building is used as the home of a dragon named Aloeus in S. Andrew Swann's fantasy novel Dragons of the Cuyahoga.
- The building's interior and exterior appeared in several scenes in Marvel's Avengers from 2012.
- The building is used as the setting for D.M. Pulley's novel The Dead Key, winner of the Amazon Breakthrough Novel Award in 2014.

== See also ==
- Downtown Cleveland

== Bibliography ==
- Alexiou, Alice Sparberg (2013). The Flatiron: The New York Landmark and the Incomparable City That Arose With It. New York: St. Martin's Press. ISBN 9781429923873.
- Becker, Thea Gallo (2004). Cleveland, 1796-1929. Charleston, S.C.: Arcadia Publishing. ISBN 9780738532677.
- Cleveland Trust Company (1909). "The Development of Civilization in America": Reproductions of the Mural Paintings by Frank Millet in the Main Banking Room of the Cleveland Trust Company. Cleveland: Cleveland Trust Company. hdl:2027/mdp.39015024467659.
- "An Elegant New Bank Building". Ohio Architect and Builder: 36–38. January 1908.
- Gregor, Sharon E. (2010). Rockefeller's Cleveland. Charleston, S.C.: Arcadia Publishing. ISBN 9780738577111.
- Hartman, Jan Cigliano (1991). Showplace of America: Cleveland's Euclid Avenue, 1850-1910. Kent, Ohio: Kent State University Press. ISBN 9780873384452.
- Landau, Sarah Bradford (1998). George B. Post, Architect: Picturesque Designer and Determined Realist. New York: The Monacelli Press. ISBN 9781885254924.
- Rose, William Ganson (1990). Cleveland: The Making of a City. Kent, Ohio: Kent State University Press. ISBN 9780873384285.
- Ruhlman, Michael (2017). Grocery: The Buying and Selling of Food in America. New York: Abrams Press. pp. 273–292. ISBN 9781419723865.
- Smith, G.E. Kidder (1996). Source Book of American Architecture: 500 Notable Buildings From the 10th Century to the Present. New York: Princeton Architectural Press. ISBN 9781568982533.
- Stein, Carl J. (2010). Greening Modernism: Preservation, Sustainability, and the Modern Movement. New York: W.W. Norton & Co. ISBN 9780393732832.
- White, Norval; Willensky, Elliot; Leadon, Fran (2010). AIA Guide to New York City. Oxford, UK: Oxford University Press. ISBN 9780195383850.
