= Pulley (disambiguation) =

A pulley is a device used to transfer mechanical energy.

Pulley may also refer to:

- Pulley (band)
- Pulley, Shropshire, village in England
- Sheila Maid, an overhead clothes rack, called a 'pulley' in Scotland

== Surname ==
- Andrew Pulley (born 1951), American politician
- B. S. Pully (1910–1972), American comedian and stage actor
- Charles Pulley (1864–1947), British politician and horse breeder
- Curtis Pulley (born 1986), American football player
- D.M. Pulley, American mystery writer
- Elizabeth Pulley (1762–1837), British convict and early settler of Australia
- Emily Pulley (born 1967), American opera soprano
- Frank P. Pulley (1852–1928), American politician
- Gerald P. Pulley (1922–2011), American photographer
- Gordon Pulley (1936–2024), English footballer
- Natasha Pulley (born 1988), British author
- Spencer Pulley (born 1993), American football player

== See also ==
- Puli, a breed of Hungarian herding and livestock guarding dog
- Pully, municipality in Switzerland
