= Rysa =

Rysa may refer to:

== People ==
- Rysa Walker, American science fiction writer

== Places ==
- Rysa Little, Scotland

== Other ==
- Scratch (2008 film)
