= ABNA =

ABNA may refer to:

- Abna', a group of Persians in early Islamic Yemen
- AhlulBayt News Agency (ABNA), Iran
- Amazon Breakthrough Novel Award
- Australasian Biospecimen Network Association
