= Swetland Building (Cleveland) =

Coordinates: 41°30′00.3″N 81°41′08.7″W

1010 Euclid Avenue
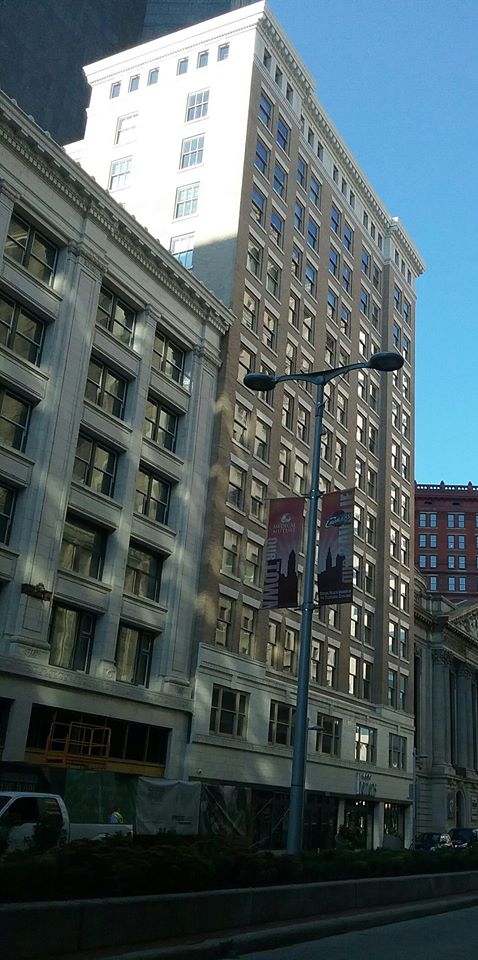
- Interactive map of the 1010 Euclid Avenue area
- Former names: Swetland Building

General information
- Type: Office/Retail
- Location: 1010 Euclid Avenue Cleveland, Ohio 44115 United States
- Construction started: 1908
- Completed: 1910

Height
- Roof: 53.4 m (175 ft)

Technical details
- Floor count: 13

Design and construction
- Architects: Searles, Hirsh & Gavin

The Swetland Building, also known as 1010 Euclid Avenue, is a 175 foot (53 m), 13-story historic high-rise building in the Nine-Twelve District of downtown Cleveland built in 1910. It is located at the intersection of Euclid and East 9th Street near other historic buildings such as the Cleveland Athletic Club, Huntington Bank Building, and Statler Arms Apartments. The Swetland is of the Chicago school of architecture and has many intricate details at its base and summit, typical of the Chicago style. Architect Alexander C. Wolf of East Cleveland had his offices in the structure and later served as a member of the Cleveland Planning Commission. Also present in the building was fine jeweler Rickey C. Tanno who started his company in 1929 in the Swetland and remained there until 1949, when he moved across the street into the Union Commerce Bank Building.

The Swetland was renovated and restored to its early 20th-century condition in 2013 and 2014 as part of a larger redevelopment by the Geis Companies of Streetsboro. The development includes the 29-story brutalist tower designed by Marcel Breuer, renovated into a luxury hotel and apartment building known as The 9 Cleveland, and the 1907-built Cleveland Trust Company Building, renovated to house the downtown Cleveland location of Heinen's Fine Foods, which closed July 31, 2026. Heinen's occupied some space in the Swetland building, while the remainder of the building is used for residential space, housing 100 apartments. Some of the apartments are offered at a subsidized rate for employees of The 9 to encourage a "work-live environment". The Ritenour Group of Twinsburg was responsible for restoring the deteriorated masonry on the facade.
