= Medical Mutual of Ohio =

Health insurance company

- Type: Mutual
- Industry: Health insurance
- Founded: 1934
- Headquarters: Cleveland, Ohio, United States
- Key people: Tony Helton; Interim CEO
- Products: supplemental health insurance and life insurance
- Revenue: ▲$2.0 billion (2008)
- Number of employees: 2,500 (2013)
- Website: Medmutual.com

Medical Mutual of Ohio (MMOH) is an American mutual health insurance company. It is the oldest and largest health insurance company based in Cleveland, Ohio, and serves more than 1.6 million customers. Employing 2,500 people, Medical Mutual is one of the biggest employers in downtown Cleveland.

Headquartered in Cleveland's historic Rose Building, the company also has statewide offices in Cincinnati, Columbus, Dayton, Independence, Richfield, Toledo and Youngstown, as well as an information systems facility in Beachwood. In 2019, Medical Mutual of Ohio ranked 718 out of the top 1,000 corporations in America.

== Headquarters ==
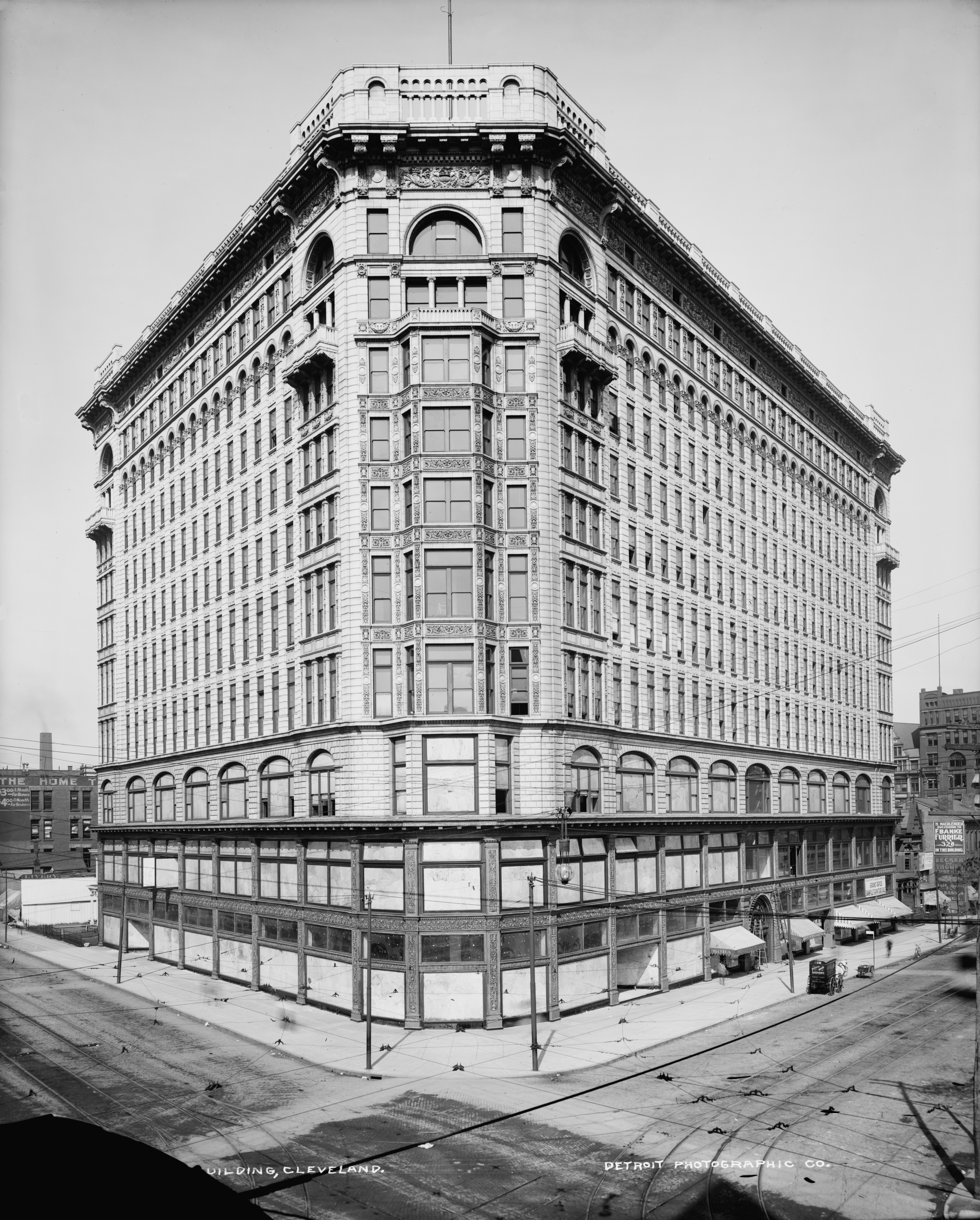
The Rose Building, c. 1900

Headquartered in downtown Cleveland, Ohio, Medical Mutual of Ohio operates in the historic Rose Building. The Rose Building was erected in 1900 and "its innovative steel-frame structure was one of the first in Cleveland." Meant to house dentists' offices, the Rose Building had almost 100 dentist tenants by 1902.

== History ==
In 1926, Elyria Memorial Hospital administrator John R. Mannix began experimenting with the idea of hospital pre-payment and the basic principles of insurance, eventually leading to the formation of the Cleveland Hospital Service Association in 1934. At this time, hospital associations such as the CHSA became known as Blue Cross Plans. In 1939, Blue Cross Plans united to form the Blue Cross Association

In 1956, Medical Mutual of Cleveland was formed to provide coverage for doctor fees. CHSA merged with Akron Hospital Service to form Blue Cross of Northeast Ohio in 1957, and four years later, Medical Mutual of Cleveland became affiliated with the Blue Shield system.

In 1984, Blue Cross of Northeast Ohio and Medical Mutual of Cleveland merged to form Blue Cross and Blue Shield of Northern Ohio. Two years after the merger, the new company joined Blue Cross and Blue Shield of Northwest Ohio to form Blue Cross and Blue Shield of Ohio.

In 1997, the company left the Blue Cross/Blue Shield Association and re-claimed the name of one of its predecessors, becoming the present day Medical Mutual of Ohio.

== Significant milestones ==
- 1934 - Cleveland Hospital Service Association formed to provide hospitalization insurance.
- 1939 - Blue Cross Association formed. CHSA was a member.
- 1945 - Medical Mutual of Cleveland formed to provide insurance for physicians’ bills.
- 1957 - CHSA merged with Akron Hospital Service to form Blue Cross of Northeast Ohio.
- 1961 - Medical Mutual of Cleveland becomes affiliated with the Blue Shield System.
- 1984 - Blue Cross of Northeast Ohio merged with Medical Mutual to form Blue Cross and Blue Shield of Northern Ohio.
- 1986 - Blue Cross and Blue Shield of Northern Ohio merged with Blue Cross of Northwest Ohio to form Blue Cross and Blue Shield of Ohio.
- 1993 - Among the fastest-growing healthcare companies with a managed care product known today as SuperMed. SuperMed proved beneficial to the Greater Cleveland Growth Association’s Council of Smaller Enterprises (COSE) and later became a national model for insurance among small businesses, chambers, and associations.
- 1997 - Blue Cross and Blue Shield of Ohio renamed Medical Mutual of Ohio. Kent Clapp named chairman, president and chief executive officer.
- 1997 - Medical Mutual expanded beyond health insurance and created Antares Management Solutions to leverage the company's computer systems.
- 2001 - Medical Mutual's Preferred Provider Organization (PPO), SuperMed Plus, is recognized as the first PPO in the United States to earn Full Accreditation from the National Committee for Quality Assurance.
- 2003 - Medical Mutual purchased Consumers Life Insurance Company, which held licenses to sell insurance in 38 states.
- 2007 - Medical Mutual acquired Carolina Care Plan, one of the largest health maintenance organizations (HMOs) in South Carolina.
- 2010 - Medical Mutual selected to run the Ohio High Risk Pool by the Ohio Department of Insurance. The program ended in March 2013.
- 2011 - Medical Mutual, for the third consecutive year, makes the InformationWeek 500 annual listing of the nation's most innovative users of business technology.
- 2016 - Medical Mutual acquires HealthSpan insurance from Mercy Health.

== Rick Chiricosta ==
Rick Chiricosta, born February 23, 1956, is chairman, president, and chief executive officer of Medical Mutual of Ohio. He will retire at the end of 2022.

== In the community ==
Medical Mutual is the "Official Health Insurer" of a variety of organizations. Medical Mutual insures numerous professional sports teams, including the Cleveland Cavaliers, Cleveland Guardians, Cincinnati Bengals and Columbus Blue Jackets. Besides professional teams, the company is also the official insurer of numerous colleges and universities and local organizations, like the Rock and Roll Hall of Fame and Museum.

In May 2022, Medical Mutual announced a $1 million donation to Cuyahoga Community College Foundation to address the immediate needs of Tri-C students. The donation aims to support a three-part initiative, using funding to establish the Medical Mutual Workforce Training Endowed Scholarship, the Medical Mutual Student Response Endowment Fund and support the expansion of the Western Campus Food Pantry.

== Articles and interviews ==
- Inside Business magazine: "The Feeling's Mutual : After Losing CEO Kent Clapp in a tragic accident, Medical Mutual is back on track with longtime leader Rick Chiricosta". (June 2009)
- Reuters.com: "Walgreens Accepts Medical Mutual of Ohio Prescription Plan" (February 11, 2009)
- Reuters.com: "Medical Mutual of Ohio Earns Top Accreditation for Product Excellence" (March 31, 2008)
- Inside Business magazine: "Prescription for prevention: with today's aging population, Kent Clapp leads medical mutual of Ohio to new heights by focusing on preventative health care". (November 2007)
