= IMG Center =

Office building in Ohio, United States

Coordinates: 41°30′13″N 81°41′25″W

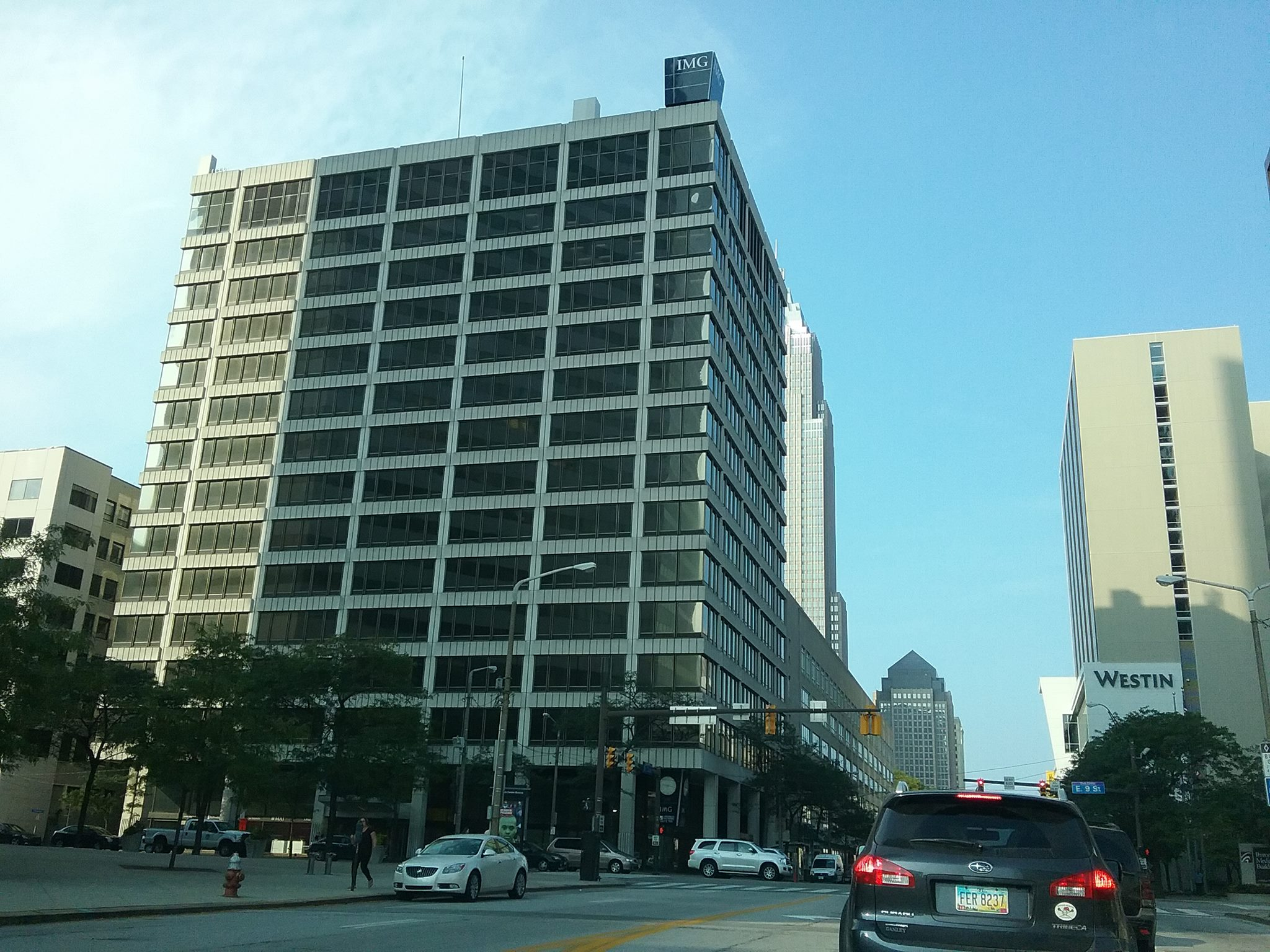
- Interactive map of the IMG Center area
- Former names: One Erieview Plaza, Cuyahoga Savings Plaza

General information
- Type: Office
- Location: 1360 East Ninth Street Cleveland, Ohio 44114 United States
- Construction started: 1965
- Completed: 1965

Height
- Roof: 180 ft (54.9 m)

Technical details
- Floor count: 16

Design and construction
- Architects: Schafer, Flynn & Van Dijk

The IMG Center is a modernist styled 16-story office building in downtown Cleveland's Nine-Twelve District. Designed by Schafer, Flynn & Van Dijk, this 180 feet (54.9 metres) tall high-rise was built in 1965. It sits at the prominent Cleveland intersection of East Ninth and St. Clair. The building is named after the 1960 Cleveland founded firm International Management Group or IMG. There is a "nub" on top of the building that can be seen in all directions that bears the IMG logo. The distinctive look of the building is due its use of glass in its corners in lieu of solid corner supports. At the time of its construction, the modernist building cost $7 million.

== IMG Moves Out ==
The structure was the home of the Cleveland-based Cuyahoga Savings Bank, which was also known as One Erieview Plaza as it was a part of the Erieview plan until it was renamed the IMG Center in 1997. The company is known for its management of sports and athletic endeavors. IMG is now headquartered in New York City but their flagship office has been retained in downtown Cleveland. Originally, leaving Cleveland for New York was not the plan, in fact, Mark McCormack, a company marketing agent and the founder of the firm, offered this in 1989,

"We have had lots of opportunities to move out of Cleveland, but we've never given thought to moving. So many people at IMG have roots here. The lifestyle is especially appealing to young married couples. They are taken with the city and its heritage."

— Cleveland: Shaping the Vision

IMG left Cleveland for New York in the 2000s. IMG explained it was a marketing reach process and clientele availability necessity.

== See also ==
- List of tallest buildings in Cleveland
- Downtown Cleveland
