= J. Lincoln Fenn =

American horror author

- Born: 1970 (age 55–56); Holyoke, Massachusetts, U.S.
- Education: University of New Hampshire
- Occupation: Author
- Writing career
- Genre: Contemporary horror
- Website: www.jlincolnfenn.com

J. Lincoln Fenn (born 1970) is an American author of contemporary horror. Her debut novel Poe was the 2013 Amazon Breakthrough Novel Award finalist in the Science Fiction/Fantasy/Horror category, and was subsequently published by 47North. Gallery Books, a division of Simon & Schuster, published Fenn's second novel Dead Souls, and released her third novel, The Nightmarchers, in October 2018.

== Biography ==
Fenn was born in Holyoke, Massachusetts, and raised in The Berkshires. She graduated summa cum laude from the University of New Hampshire with a bachelor's degree in English. Currently, she lives in Seattle, Washington.

== Work ==
=== Novels ===
- Poe (47North, October 2013)
- Dead Souls (Gallery Books, September 2016)
- The Nightmarchers (Gallery Books, October 2018)
