= Peter van Dijk (architect) =

American architect (1929–2019)

- Born: February 13, 1929; Surabaya, Dutch East Indies
- Died: September 7, 2019 (aged 90); Cleveland Heights, Ohio, U.S.
- Education: Cornell University; University of Oregon; MIT School of Architecture and Planning
- Occupation: Architect

Peter van Dijk (February 13, 1929 – September 7, 2019) was an American architect who designed many buildings in Ohio, including the Blossom Music Center in Cuyahoga Falls.

== Early years ==
van Dijk was born to a Dutch family in what was then the Dutch East Indies, now Indonesia, where his father worked as an engineer for Royal Dutch Shell. After a couple years there, the family moved for another assignment to Maracaibo, Venezuela and spent about twelve years there, with brief sojourns in the Netherlands every few years. In Venezuela young van Dijk constructed toys and drew, and picked up swimming which would become an avocation for the rest of his life. When World War II started, the family stayed in Latin America, and sent van Dijk and his brother to Curaçao for boarding school, where he spent eighth and ninth grades. During the war, when van Dijk was 14, Shell transferred his father to New York City; van Dyjk attended Mamaroneck High School in Mamaroneck, New York for two years, and swam for the school's swim team.

He graduated from Mamaroneck High School at age 16, and then studied engineering at Cornell University. After two years there, he decided he did not want to be an engineer, and that architecture interested him. He spent a year working for an architect in New Rochelle, New York. van Dijk then applied as a transfer student to the University of Oregon, where he received a full scholarship "mainly for swimming," studied architecture, met Buckminster Fuller and led a 15-student team that created a geodesic dome under Fuller's direction, and graduated in 1953. He became a U.S. citizen in the same year.

van Dijk was drafted into the U.S. Army where he served for two years from 1953 to 1955. When the Army posted him to Fort Bragg in North Carolina, he spent weekends visiting Fuller at his home and workplace at North Carolina State. van Dijk then took advantage of the G.I. Bill to earn a master's degree in architecture from MIT, where he studied with Louis Kahn and Pietro Belluschi. After Belluschi introduced him to Eero Saarinen, he worked under Saarinen for his architecture firm in Bloomfield Hills, Michigan, for four years, where he contributed to projects including the design of Dulles Airport. van Dijk took a year-long leave of absence in 1959 to study Renaissance architecture in Rome as a Fulbright Scholar.

== Ohio career ==
In 1961, following Saarinen's unexpected death at age 51, van Dijk moved to Cleveland to oversee the design of the 32-story Anthony J. Celebrezze Federal Building, which was completed in 1966. Three architecture firms were involved in its design, but they could not agree on which firm would lead its design, instead agreeing to hire van Dijk to lead the design. Each of the three firms offered van Dijk a job at its conclusion. Although he had planned to return to Oregon afterward, in 1963 he accepted the offer from the firm Schafer, Flynn & Associates, which by 1966 had changed its name to Schafer, Flynn, van Dijk & Associates. He continued to work at that firm, as its name continued to change, until, and in fact after, his retirement in 2004.

Blossom Music Center, the outdoor amphitheater that is the summer home of the Cleveland Orchestra, is van Djik's most best known design, the accomplishment typically noted when a headline summarizes his life, and his "masterpiece" according to an architecture website. Construction of Blossom was started in 1966 and completed in 1968. The project's genesis was that Cleveland music director George Szell wanted his orchestra to be able to employ its musicians year-round, as some other leading orchestras did. To develop plans for Blossom, with a team that also included structural engineer Miklos Peller and acoustician Christopher Jaffe, van Dijk visited and studied other outdoor amphitheaters, including what he called "the two major precedents," Ravinia Pavilion in Highland Park, Illinois, and Tanglewood in the Berkshire Hills of western Massachusetts. They found the acoustics of both lacking. van Dijk later said, "we decided to focus on two things. We wanted good acoustics, and we wanted the audience to be able to see the performers from any direction." The team developed an orchestra shell and a curving roof, to expand and project sound, assisted by the site's natural parabolic setting. Blossom's design allows concertgoers in the pavilion to have unobstructed and close views of the stage, while seeing the area's natural beauty through open sides. Its shape echoed the rolling hills of its surroundings in the Cuyahoga Valley. It used long-lasting materials including weathering steel, slate, and wood. Blossom was recently described by a local writer as "the place you take out-of-town guests in the summertime if you want to blow their socks off" and "one of the most desirable outdoor performance destinations in America."

van Dijk designed more than 50 buildings in northeast Ohio. In addition to Blossom, van Dijk's designs included (all are in the Cleveland area, unless otherwise noted):

- buildings for educational institutions including Cleveland State University's music building, physical education building, and natatorium; Ursuline College; the University School upper school; and the chapel and rec center of John Caroll University,
- other performance spaces including Cain Park Amphitheater, Westlake Performing Arts and Rec centers, and the Buell Theater in Denver,
- medical facilities at the Cleveland Clinic and University Hospital and in Akron, Youngstown, Cincinnati, and Warren, Ohio, and Wheeling, West Virginia, and
- corporate headquarters for Parker Hannifin, B. F. Goodrich, Lubrizol, Invacare, and IMG.

In the 1970s, van Dijk made a career "pivot," which he described as shifting "from designing modernist buildings to preserving historic landmarks." This work of renovating or repurposing older buildings began when Union Commerce Bank asked him to redesign the Union Commerce Building's lobby by filling the space with modern offices, and instead, van Dijk said, "I told them that they should preserve what they had: that it was probably the grandest bank in America." He later designed the renovation of Cleveland's Playhouse Square theaters, saving them from destruction. Other notable structures that van Dijk renovated or repurposed include the Cleveland Federal Reserve Bank, the Society for Savings Building, M.K. Ferguson Plaza, the Cleveland Soldiers' and Sailors' Monument, and the 1981 conversion of the old Akron post office into the Akron Art Museum. He also oversaw the 2013 renovation of Blossom Music Center, his design of almost fifty years earlier.

After his retirement, van Dijk continued to mentor young architects, and to be involved in planning and civic affairs.

van Dijk is widely recognized as having shaped the northeast Ohio region over more than 50 years of work there, by designing or preserving a significant number of its landmark structures. A 2016 award citation wrote that his "innovative designs continue to enhance the aesthetics, environment, and quality of life of Northeast Ohio and other cities." An architecture website described him as "an influential American architect" whose "architectural approach was characterized by a strong emphasis on functionality, community engagement, and cultural significance, melding both modernist and traditional design elements," concluding, "Through his work, van Dijk made a lasting impact on urban development and the preservation of architectural heritage."

== Personal life ==
van Dijk first married the former Donna Daley. They divorced in 1972. He married his second wife, Roberta “Bobbi” Steffey (née Skeivis), in 1974, and she survived him. He had three sons, a daughter, and a step-son.

He spoke six languages, describing himself as "fluent" in Dutch, Spanish and English, and "conversant" in Italian, French and German.

He was a world class masters swimmer who broke international records into his 80s. He won 50 national championships in freestyle and backstroke, and 17 international gold medals (all as of 2015; in a 2016 interview he said 60 national championships and 17 world championships), including winning four gold medals at age 85 at the 2014 Masters World Championship in Montreal.

van Dijk's friends called him Piet, spelled the Dutch way.

== Recognition ==
van Dijk was awarded the Cleveland Arts Prize twice: the architecture award in 1969, and a special tribute in 2016. He was a fellow of the Ohio chapter of the American Institute of Architects, and was awarded its gold medal in 2000. He received additional awards from the Cleveland Restoration Society, and National Preservation Honor Awards. In November 2011, the Cleveland Institute of Art, on whose board of directors van Dijk had served for two stints and a total of 31 years, gave him its Medal for Excellence. In 2015, he was inducted into the Greater Cleveland Sports Hall of Fame, for swimming.
