= The 9 Cleveland =

Building complex in Cleveland, Ohio

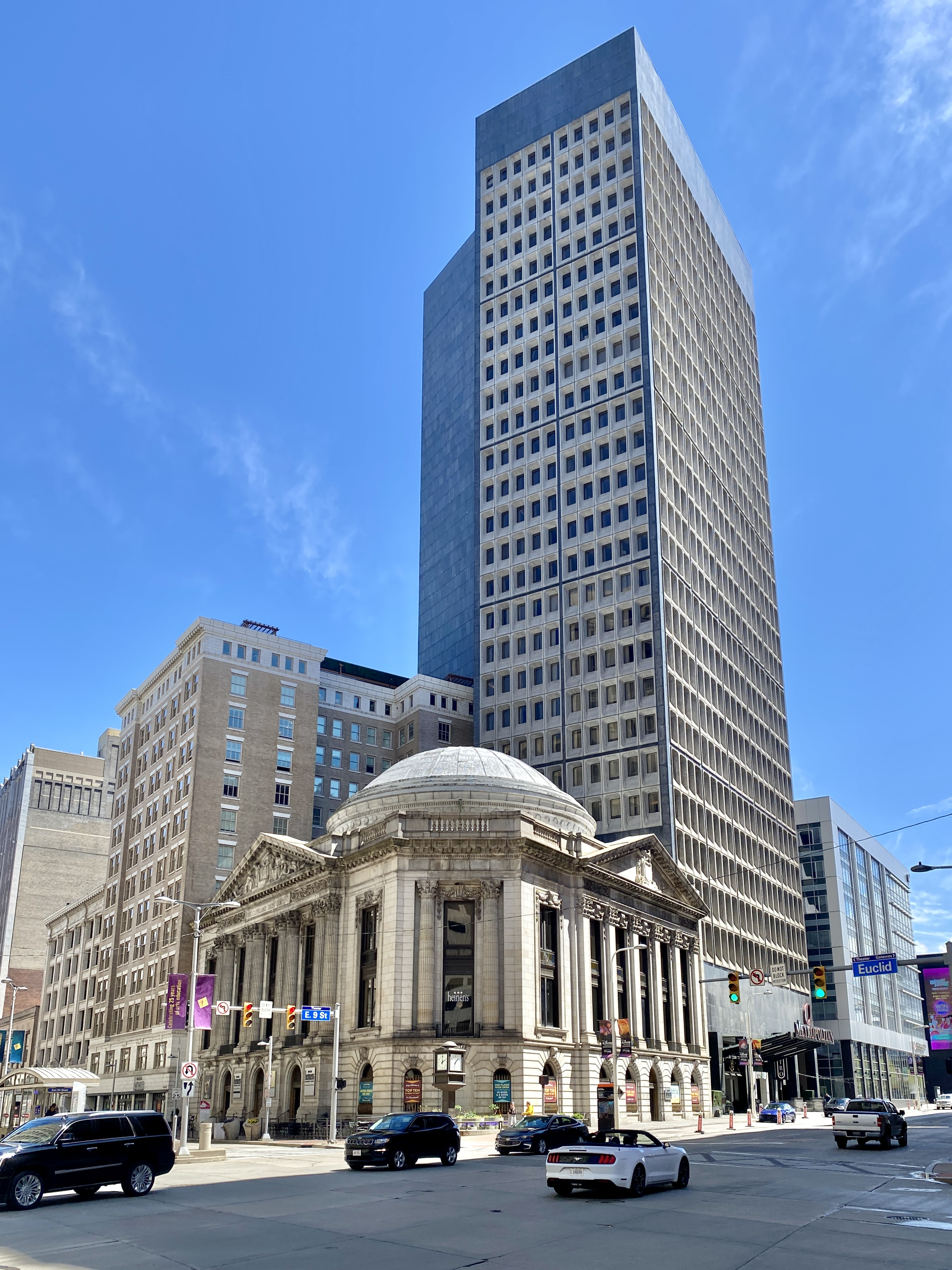
- View from Euclid Avenue and East 9th Street in 2023
- Interactive map of the The 9 Cleveland area
- Former names: Ameritrust Tower; Cleveland Trust Building; AT Tower
- Alternative names: 900 Euclid Tower
- Hotel chain: Metropolitan at the 9

General information
- Status: Completed
- Type: Skyscraper
- Architectural style: Modernism
- Classification: Mixed residential and commercial
- Location: Theater District, 900 Euclid Avenue, Cleveland, Ohio, United States
- Coordinates: 41°29′59″N 81°41′09″W
- Construction started: 1968
- Completed: 1971
- Renovated: 2013
- Cost: $30,000,000
- Owner: Geis Companies

Height
- Height: 390 feet (120 m)

Technical details
- Structural system: Composite
- Floor count: 28

Design and construction
- Architects: Marcel Breuer; Hamilton Smith
- Architecture firm: Marcel Breuer & Associates

Other information
- Number of stores: 1
- Number of rooms: 156
- Number of restaurants: 2
- Number of bars: 2
- Facilities: 4

Website
- www.metropolitancleveland.com

The 9 Cleveland is a residential and commercial complex located in Downtown Cleveland, Ohio, United States, at the corner of East Ninth Street and Euclid Avenue. It includes three buildings, the largest of which is a 29-story, 383 feet (117 m) tower commonly known by its previous name of Ameritrust Tower and formerly known as the Cleveland Trust Tower. The tower was completed in 1971 and is an example of brutalist architecture, the only skyscraper designed by Marcel Breuer and Hamilton Smith. The complex also includes the adjacent Cleveland Trust Company Building, completed in 1908, and the Swetland Building.

Although plans called for a second mirror-image tower, the second building was never constructed. The Breuer tower initially served as headquarters for Ameritrust Bank before its merger with Society Bank. Society Bank has since merged with KeyBank. The tower was vacant from 1996 until September 2014, before it was converted to apartments and a hotel as part of a larger project involving the other buildings in the complex. The space also includes a wine cellar and restaurant. The rotunda was renovated and reopened as a Heinen's Fine Foods grocery store in 2015 and the Swetland Building was restored for residential use.

== Ameritrust Tower 1991 proposal ==
In 1990, developer Richard Jacobs proposed constructing a new tower for the AmeriTrust Corporation on Cleveland's Public Square. About $500 million was budgeted for the project. The Architectural firm of Kohn Pedersen Fox or KPF of New York City would have designed the new AmeriTrust Tower. Coincidentally, KPF would have designed the new Cuyahoga County Administration Building which was planned in the late 2000s to replace the Ameritrust Tower (built in 1971). In 1992, Ameritrust merged with Society Bank (now KeyBank), obviating the need for the Ameritrust Tower. Had the Ameritrust Tower been built, it was planned to be 61 stories, 920 feet tall to the roof, and have a curved glass curtain wall, a Hyatt Hotel, and high-end shopping including Giorgio Armani and Versace as anchor tenants.

== 2005 purchase ==
In 2005, Cuyahoga County purchased the tower, the historic Cleveland Trust Company rotunda, and several other surrounding structures from the Jacobs Group for use as the site for a new county headquarters. This was done after a study completed by Weber Murphy Fox and Orfield Laboratories, had concluded that the building was a very high quality for office occupancy, when compared with the Hudson Department Store building, which the County was considering for office occupancy. On March 29, 2007, the Cuyahoga County Commissioners voted to demolish the tower and to replace it with a new building to be designed by Kohn Pedersen Fox. Two commissioners, James "Jimmy" Dimora and Timothy Hagan, wanted to demolish the tower, while commissioner Peter Lawson-Jones supported renovation. The Cleveland Planning Commission approved demolition of the landmark Ameritrust Tower, to the chagrin of preservationists, who argued that the county would destroy a valued piece of architecture. A June 2008 Cleveland Magazine article said that the county's own consultants told commissioners that it would be cheaper and more prudent to renovate the tower for its own use.

However, later in 2007, the Cuyahoga County Commissioners, claiming a desire to devote more of their energies for Medical Mart and Convention Center, decided to attempt to sell the complex to private developers. The County declared that it would not sell the property for less than $35 million, which represented the purchase price plus expenditures on the property, including the removal of asbestos. The only bid on the complex was submitted by the K&D group of Willoughby, Ohio, for $35,005,000 however the deal fell apart in 2009.

Federal investigators scrutinized the 2005 purchase of the Ameritrust complex, the attempted sale, and the removal of the asbestos as part of their probe into corruption in the Cuyahoga County government. In 2012, federal prosecutors alleged that attorney Anthony Calabrese III had offered to bribe county employee J. Kevin Kelley in 2005 if Kelley could convince Dimora to vote to purchase the complex. The accusation was contained in a witness-tampering charge against Calabrese, which was later dropped.

== 2013 sale and rebranding ==
In December 2012, Cuyahoga County Executive Ed FitzGerald announced that the County would sell the Ameritrust complex, including the tower, the rotunda building, and two other office buildings to the Geis Companies of Streetsboro, Ohio, for $27 million. Geis Cos. agreed to raze the smaller buildings, known as the P&H buildings, and to build an eight story office building to be used by the County as a consolidated headquarters building. The parties envisioned that the county would move about 750 employees into the newly constructed building from eight other locations by mid-2014. The County agreed to make lease payments of $6.7 million on 222,000 square feet of space for a period of 26 years with a County option to buy the new building at the end of the term for $1. Chaim Schochet argued against the project stating that the last thing Cleveland needed was more office space and instead proposed that the headquarters be put on the first six floors of the half vacant Huntington Bank Building owned by Optima Ventures.

The Cuyahoga County Council approved the sale in January 2013. Geis Cos. took ownership of the Ameritrust complex in February 2013. The tower now houses 104 apartments and a luxury hotel known as the Metropolitan. Heinen's, a Cleveland-based high-end grocer, opened a store in the Ameritrust Rotunda on February 25, 2015, and closed it on July 31, 2026.

== See also ==
- List of tallest buildings in Cleveland
