= D.M. Pulley =

American novelist

- Occupation: Author
- Writing career
- Period: 2014–present
- Notable awards: Amazon Breakthrough Novel Award (2014)
- Movement: Mystery/thriller
- Website: www.dmpulley.com

D.M. Pulley is an American writer and the author of the mystery/thriller novel The Dead Key. After winning the Amazon Breakthrough Novel Award in July 2014, Pulley received a publishing contract with Amazon Publishing (under the Thomas & Mercer imprint).

Pulley's second book, a novel entitled The Buried Book, was published on August 23, 2016, by Lake Union, an imprint of Amazon Publishing.

Pulley's third book, a novel entitled The Unclaimed Victim, was published on November 17, 2017, by Thomas & Mercer, an imprint of Amazon Publishing.

Pulley's fourth book, a novel entitled No One's Home, was published on September 1, 2019, by Thomas & Mercer, an imprint of Amazon Publishing.

Pulley has contributed a short story entitled Tremonster to Cleveland Noir, an installment in the Akashic Noir Series, published on August 1, 2023, by Akashic Books.

Pulley's fifth book, a novel entitled Stone Mad, was published on October 13, 2026, by Blackstone Publishing.

== Writing career ==
Working as a structural engineer in Cleveland, Ohio, Pulley was performing a survey of the vacant Swetland Building. During that survey, she encountered an abandoned vault, complete with hundreds of locked safe deposit boxes that may or may not have been empty. The mothballed building's offices were still furnished and the filing cabinets were still full of files. The notion of a building so full of potential secrets left an impression on her for several years hence. In 2010, Pulley began formulating a novel based on that experience, and finally submitted it to the contest in early 2014.
