= Rysa Walker =

American science fiction writer

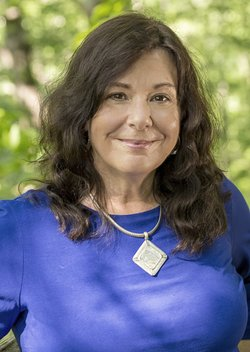
- Walker in 2013
- Born: Pensacola, Florida
- Education: St. Andrews University; University of North Carolina at Chapel Hill
- Occupation: Author
- Writing career
- Pen name: Rysa Walker; C. Rysa Walker
- Period: 2012–present
- Genres: Science fiction, time travel fiction, mystery
- Notable awards: Amazon Breakthrough Novel Award (2013)
- Website: www.rysa.com

Rysa Walker an American author of science fiction, fantasy, and mysteries. Her first novel, Timebound, was the 2013 Grand Prize winner of the Amazon Breakthrough Novel Award.

== Early life and education ==
Walker was born and raised in Northwest Florida. After graduating from St. Andrews University in North Carolina, she earned a PhD in political science from the University of North Carolina at Chapel Hill.

== Career ==
Walker taught political science and history at several universities before beginning to write fiction full time in 2014. After her family relocated to Cary, North Carolina in 2006 for her husband's job, she shifted to teaching her college courses online so she could work from home.

Walker's first novel, Timebound (The CHRONOS Files Book One), was originally self-published as Time's Twisted Arrow in 2012. In January 2013, she entered the book into the Amazon Breakthrough Novel Award contest, competing against 10,000 self-published and unpublished novels. The Publishers Weekly review of the book during the competition called the book's heroine, Kate Pierce-Keller, the "Katniss Everdeen of time travel," adding that the story reads like a mash-up of Jack Finney's Time and Again and Erik Larson's The Devil in the White City, and works as a contemporary tribute to Robert Heinlein's juvenile novels of the 1950s.

On June 15, 2013, Timebound won the contest's grand prize, leading to a $50,000 advance and a contract with Skyscape, an Amazon Publishing imprint. Walker has said the prize allowed her to take a year off from teaching to write full-time.

Timebound has been translated into fourteen languages, and the CHRONOS Files series has sold nearly half a million copies since 2013. Five additional CHRONOS novels were published through the Skyscape and 47North imprints beginning in 2016. A separate science fiction series, The Delphi Trilogy, was published by Skyscape beginning in 2017.

In addition to science fiction, Walker writes mysteries as C. Rysa Walker, sometimes in collaboration with author Caleb Amsel.

== Reception ==
Time's Edge, the second book in The CHRONOS Files, appeared at number ten on the Wall Street Journal's bestselling fiction e-books list for October 30, 2014.

The Delphi Effect was a finalist for the 2018 International Thriller Writers Awards, a 2017 Amazon Editors' Pick for Best Science Fiction, and a 2017 Junior Library Guild selection.

The Publishers Weekly review of Now, Then, and Everywhen praised what it described as a twisty narrative blending the past and the future, predicting that fans of intelligent time-travel stories would be rewarded.

== Bibliography ==
=== The CHRONOS Files ===
==== Novels ====
- Timebound (January 1, 2014; formerly Time's Twisted Arrow) ISBN 9780988351103 ISBN 978-1477848159
- Time's Edge (October 21, 2014) ISBN 9781477875810
- Time's Divide (October 20, 2015) ISBN 978-1503946583

==== Novellas ====
- Time's Echo (April 1, 2014) ISBN 978-0988351134
- Time's Mirror (June 30, 2015)
- Simon Says (December 18, 2015)

==== Short stories ====
- Whack Job (June 17, 2016)
- 2092 (June 18, 2016)
- The Gambit (June 18, 2016)

=== CHRONOS Origins ===
==== Novels ====
- Now, Then, and Everywhen (April 1, 2020) ISBN 978-1612189192
- Red, White, and the Blues (January 19, 2021) ISBN 978-1542019590
- Bell, Book, and Key (November 16, 2021) ISBN 978-1542019576

==== Short stories ====
- The Circle That Whines (February 4, 2020)
- Full Circle (February 5, 2020)

==== Anthology ====
- Time's Vault (June 15, 2021) ISBN 9781735866925

=== The Delphi Trilogy ===
==== Novels ====
- The Delphi Effect (October 11, 2016) ISBN 9781503993815
- The Delphi Resistance (October 24, 2017) ISBN 9781542097222
- The Delphi Revolution (October 9, 2018) ISBN 9781542098403

==== Novella ====
- The Abandoned (June 21, 2018)

=== The Icarus Code ===
- The Cold Light of Stars (May 4, 2023) ISBN 978-1735866932
- First Watch of Night (February 8, 2024) ISBN 978-1735866956
- Dark Little Worlds (March 4, 2025)
- On Alien Skies (March 11, 2026) ISBN 9781735866994

=== Enter Haddonwood (with Caleb Amsel) ===
- As the Crow Flies (October 15, 2019)
- When the Cat's Away (August 14, 2020)
- Where Wolves Fear to Prey (August 24, 2022)

=== Thistlewood Star Mysteries (as C. Rysa Walker; previously published as Jessa Archer) ===
- A Murder in Helvetica Bold (May 14, 2019) ISBN 9781694396273
- Palatino for the Painter (September 26, 2019) ISBN 9781694393739
- A Séance in Franklin Gothic (September 28, 2019) ISBN 9781694395276
- Courier to the Stars (November 29, 2019) ISBN 9781711078663
- Comic Sans for the Ex (November 3, 2020) ISBN 9798555139160

=== Coastal Playhouse Murder Mysteries (as C. Rysa Walker; previously published as Jessa Archer) ===
- Curtains for Romeo (November 4, 2019) ISBN 9781705504154
- Arsenic and Olé (November 4, 2019) ISBN 9781705506455
- Offed Off-Broadway (November 4, 2019) ISBN 9781705514290
- Exes, Stage Right (October 14, 2021) ISBN 9798494058782

=== Serial ===
- Improbable: The Outlandish Adventures of Miriam Cole: Seasons 1–11 (September 11, 2023) ISBN 9798385582631

== Personal life ==
Walker lived in Washington, D.C., before moving to Cary, North Carolina, in 2006 after her husband took a job in the area. She resides there with her husband, sons, and a golden retriever.
