= Rose Building (Cleveland) =

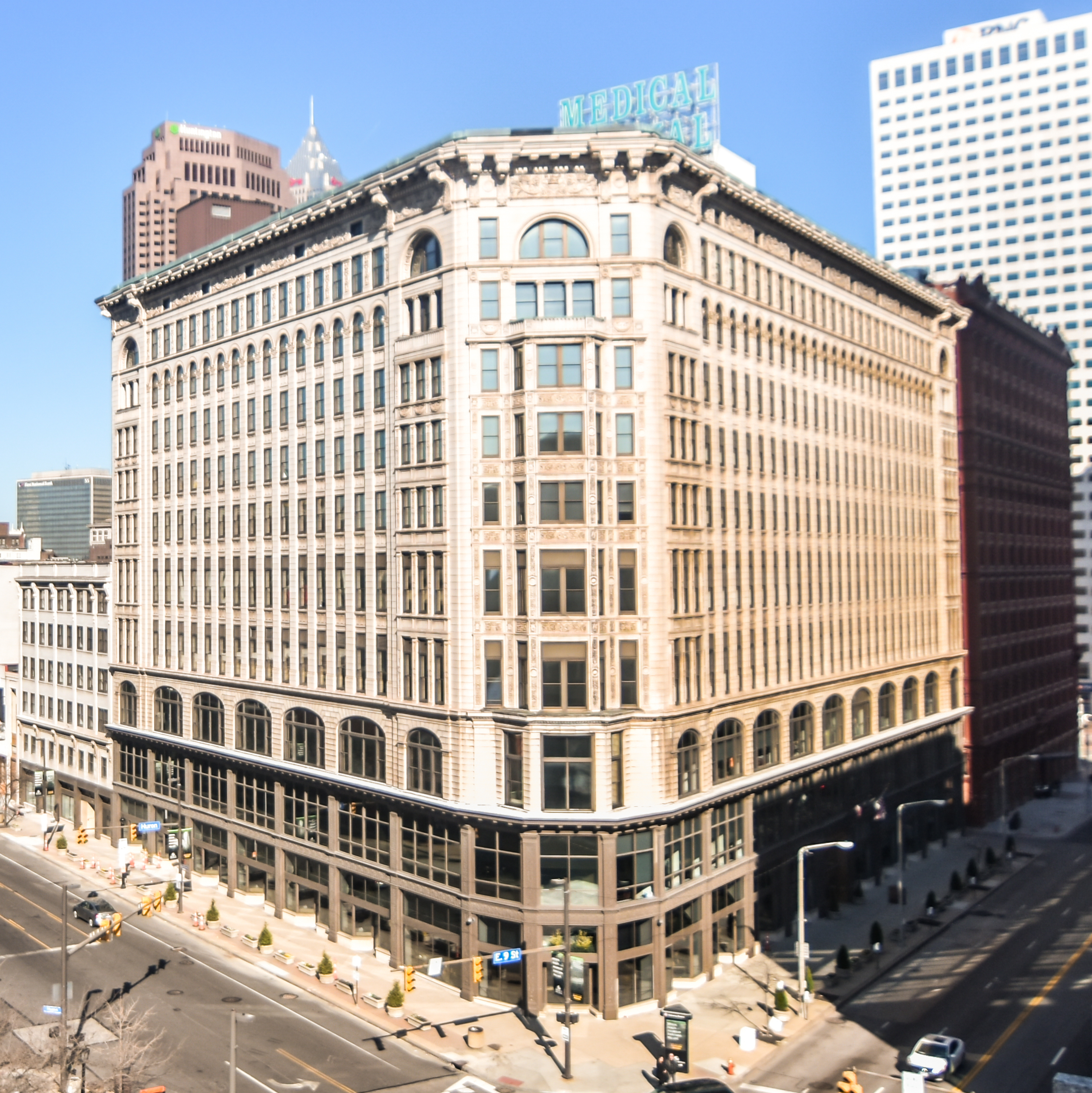
- Interactive map of the Rose Building area

General information
- Type: Office
- Location: 2060 East 9th Street Cleveland, Ohio 44115 United States
- Coordinates: 41°29′57″N 81°41′10″W
- Construction started: 1901
- Completed: 1902

Height
- Roof: 50.29 m (165 ft)

Technical details
- Floor count: 10

Design and construction
- Architect: George Horatio Smith

The Rose Building is a historic high-rise office building in Downtown Cleveland's Historic Gateway District in the U.S. state of Ohio. Built in 1902, the 10-story building stands 165 feet (50 m) tall, at the corner of Prospect Avenue and East 9th Street. It is named after Cleveland businessman and charity founder Benjamin Rose and is a designated city of Cleveland landmark. The building was the home of the Cleveland-based health insurance group Medical Mutual of Ohio from 1947 to 2023.

== Structuring ==
The floors are not the same measurement as we count ten floors today as the rule of thumb for ceiling height was different in the early 1900s. The superstructure literally follows the street grid pattern and appears to vanish into the distance as it runs parallel with its respective street facades. The Rose features wrought iron detailing on its lower floors and heavily decorated panels on the upper floors. When constructed, it was the largest office building in Ohio.

== Trivia ==
In 1902, the building was considered too far out of the Cleveland central business district and was projected to fail to obtain any tenants. The building is a fine example of turn of the century architecture and continues to guard the much traversed street of Prospect Avenue.
