= Ameritech Center =

Commercial high-rise building in Cleveland, Ohio

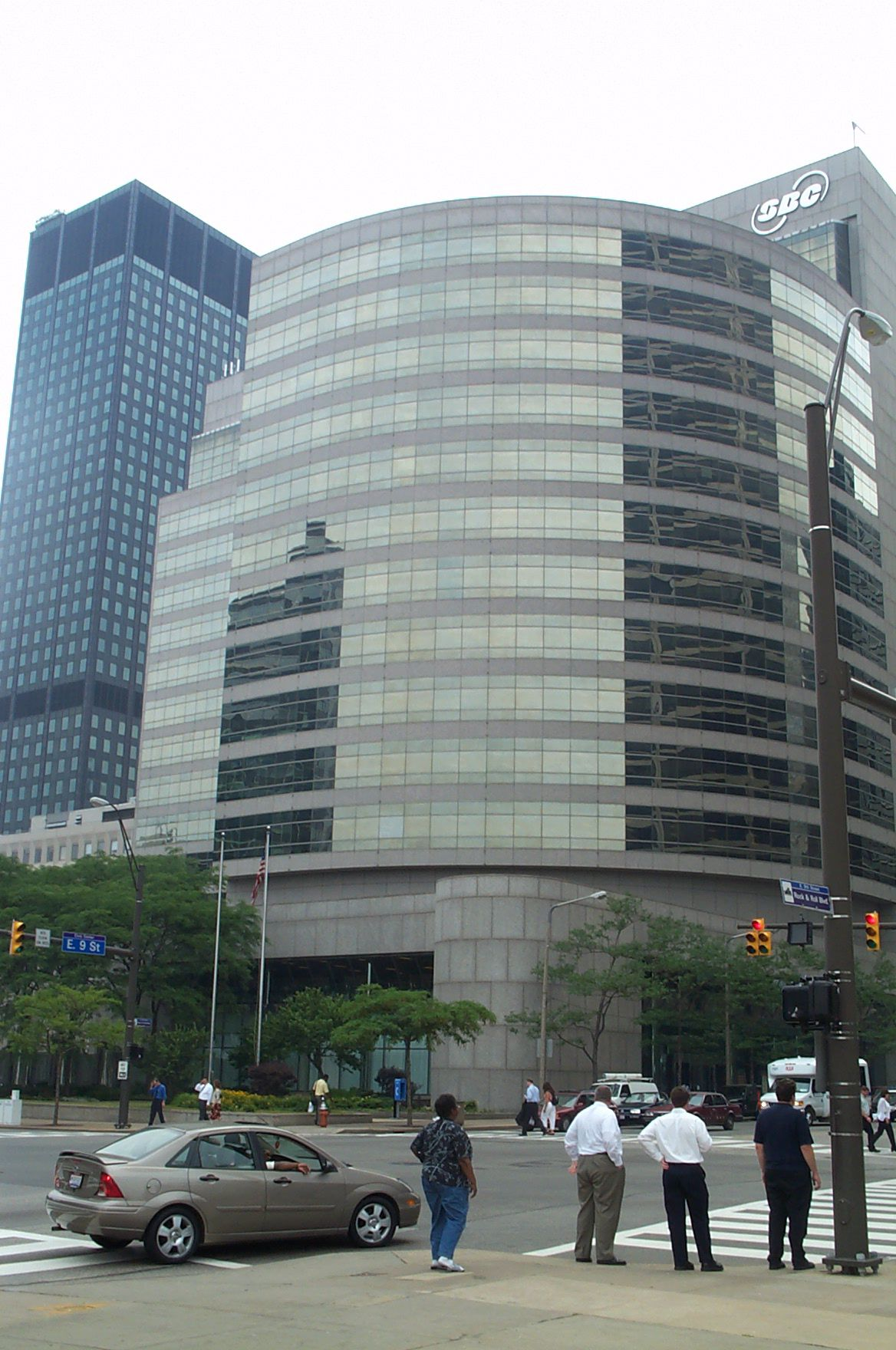
- Interactive map of the Ameritech Center area

General information
- Type: Apartments
- Location: 45 Erieview Plaza, Cleveland, Ohio United States
- Coordinates: 41.505157°N 81.690514°W
- Construction started: July 13, 1981
- Completed: 1983
- Opening: 1983

Height
- Roof: 253 ft (77 m)

Technical details
- Floor count: 16

Design and construction
- Architect: Madison Madison International
- Developer: Turner Construction Company

The Bell Apartments (formerly Ameritech Center) is an upcoming residential high-rise building in Cleveland, Ohio. The building rises 253 feet (77 m) in Downtown Cleveland as a part of the Erieview Plaza complex. It stands similar in height to the Penton Media Building and the Ohio Savings Plaza. It contains 16 floors, and was completed in 1983. The architectural firm who designed the building was Madison Madison International. AT&T Center contains offices of the Dallas-based AT&T Corporation.

AT&T in Cleveland was called Ohio Bell. Ohio Bell had been at Michigan Avenue (now vacated by Tower City Center) from 1890–1927, then they built the Huron Road complex from 1927–64, and moved to the Erieview Tower from 1964–83. In the late 1970s as more telephone technology had emerged, especially digital switching and more offices using computers, Ohio Bell needed more space. Erieview Tower did not have the space required, so Ohio Bell decided to build new headquarters at 45 Erieview Plaza.

Ground was broken on 13 July 1981 for Ohio Bell's new headquarters. It was designed by a Cleveland consortium of Dalton Dalton, Newport, and Little and Robert P. Madison International. Ohio Bell's construction of its new building occurred when Cleveland had its skyscraper boom in the 1980s. Ohio Bell, One Cleveland Center, and Eaton Center were all under construction at the same time.

The Ohio Bell Building opened in 1983 for business. The Ohio Bell Building has a mirror-like southern glass exposure which reflects the nearby Galleria at Erieview and the One Cleveland Center building. The north side has a curved glass shape to it. The building had undergone some name changes:

- 1983-1990 Ohio Bell
- 1990-1997 Ameritech
- 1998-2006 SBC
- 2006–2022 AT&T
- 2022–2024 Under construction

== The Bell Apartments ==
On February 2, 2022, Ameritech Center was sold by firm SomeraRoad for $21.15 million to Texas-based developers who announced plans to be convert the building from commercial to residential purposes. SomeraRoad had previously purchased the building for $36 million back in 2016.

== See also ==
- List of tallest buildings in Cleveland
