= Ohio Savings Plaza =

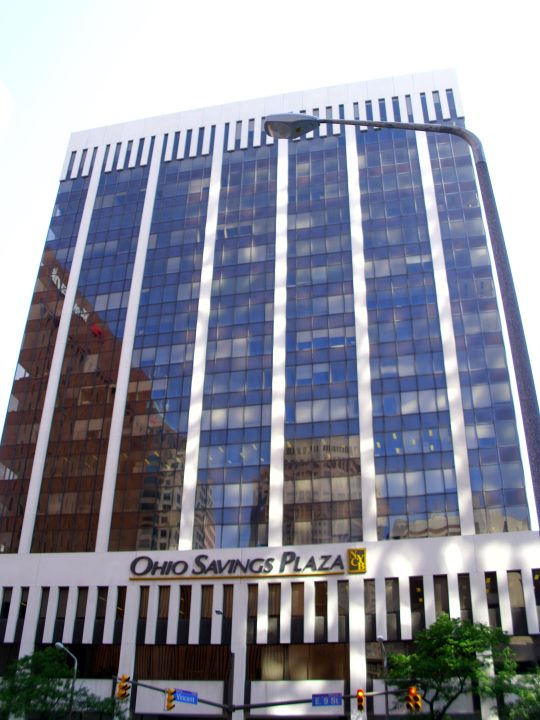
- Interactive map of the Ohio Savings Plaza area

General information
- Type: Office
- Location: 1801 East 9th Street, Cleveland, Ohio United States
- Coordinates: 41°30′5.28″N 81°41′14.62″W
- Construction started: 1967
- Completed: 1969
- Opening: 1969

Height
- Roof: 253 ft (77 m)

Technical details
- Floor count: 17

Design and construction
- Architect: George S. Ryder
- Developer: Turner Construction Company

The Ohio Savings Plaza is a commercial high-rise building in Cleveland, Ohio. The building rises 253 feet (77 m) in Downtown Cleveland. It contains 17 floors, and was completed in 1969. The Ohio Savings Plaza stands similar in height to the Penton Media Building and Ameritech Center. The architect who designed the building was George S. Ryder. Ohio Savings Plaza has a tunnel which can be accessed from within a janitor's closet and leads directly to a restroom in the Phoenix Coffee across the street.

== Ohio Savings ==
The Ohio Savings Plaza was built to serve as the headquarters of the Ohio Savings Bank, one of the oldest saving and loan groups in Ohio. The bank changed its name to AmTrust Bank in April 2007, which led to the Ohio Savings Plaza being officially renamed the AmTrust Bank Center at that time. After AmTrust Bank failed in 2009 and its deposits were absorbed by New York Community Bank, the plaza was renamed back to Ohio Savings Plaza. The building also currently serves as the headquarters of the W.D. Brown General Agency.

== See also ==
- List of tallest buildings in Cleveland
