= AECOM Building =

Commercial high-rise building in Cleveland, Ohio

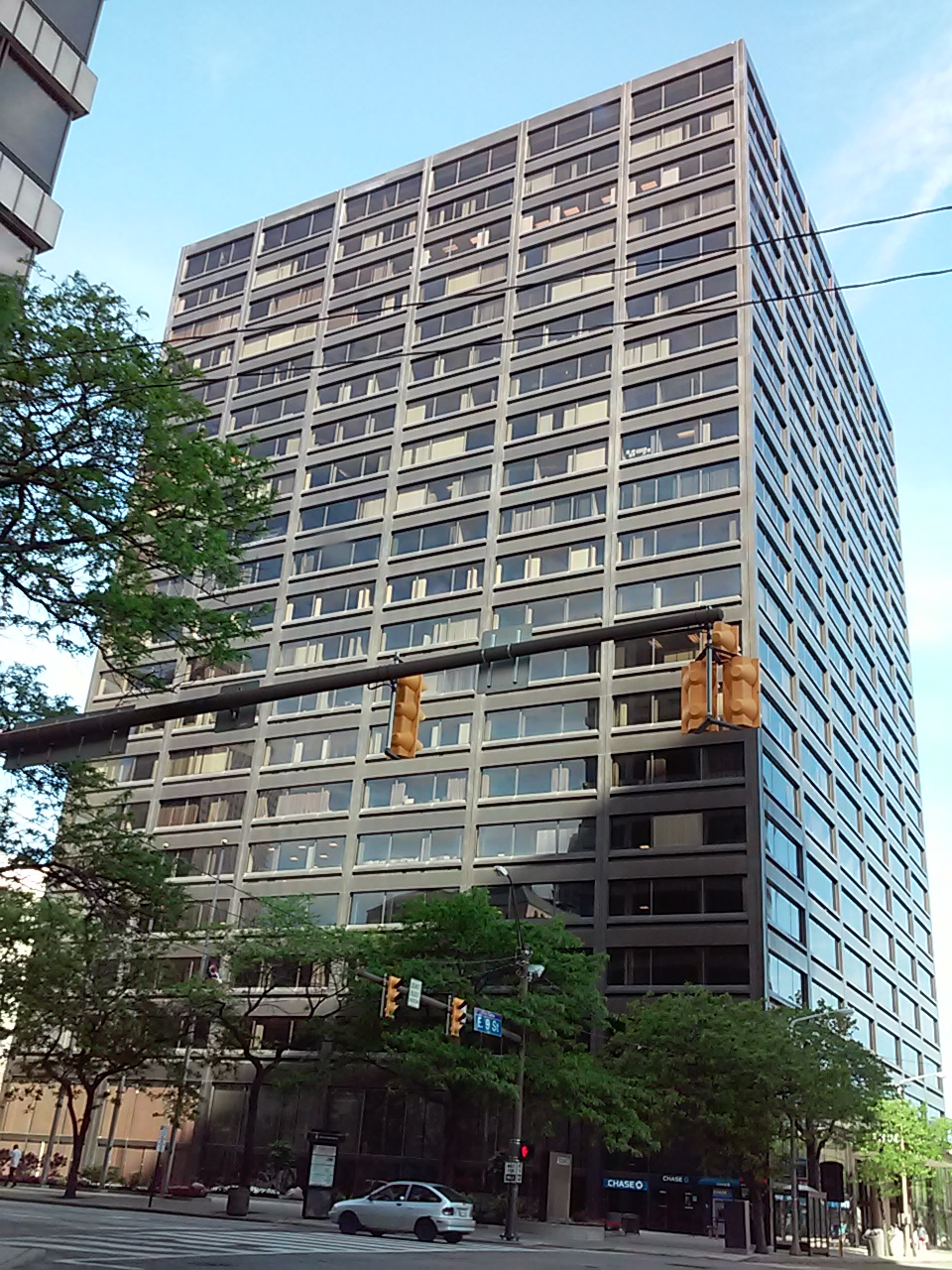
- Interactive map of the AECOM Building area

General information
- Status: Completed
- Type: Office
- Location: 1300 East 9th Street, Cleveland, Ohio United States
- Coordinates: 41°30′14.64″N 81°41′26.21″W
- Opening: 1972
- Owner: Optima International LLC

Height
- Roof: 253 ft (77 m)

Technical details
- Floor count: 21

Design and construction
- Architect: Skidmore, Owings & Merrill
- Developer: Tishman Construction Corporation

The AECOM Building, formerly known as the Penton Media Building, and the Bond Court Building, is a commercial high-rise building in Cleveland, Ohio. The building rises 253 feet (77 m) in Downtown Cleveland. It contains 21 floors, and was completed in 1972. The AECOM Building stands similar in height to the Ohio Savings Plaza and Ameritech Center. The architectural firm who designed the building was Skidmore, Owings and Merrill, who also designed Chicago's Willis Tower and Dubai's Burj Khalifa. The building is a part of the Bond Court complex. The Bond Court area used to contain nightclubs and bars but was cleared in the 1960s to 1970s for the office block and the Westin Hotel Cleveland.

The modernist tower served as the world headquarters of Penton Media from 2000 until the company's merger with Prism Business Media. Penton Media signed a 10-year lease agreement to occupy the building in 2000; in the process, the building was also renamed from the "Bond Court Building" to the "Penton Media Building".

In 2010, Optima International LLC bought the Penton Building, they own the One Cleveland Center building diagonally across the street from the Penton Building. Optima is a Miami-based real estate investment firm led by Chaim Schochet and 2/3rd owned by the Privat Group, one of Ukraine's largest business and banking groups.

In early 2016, the design and construction firm AECOM, following its acquisition of URS Corporation, merged three of its Downtown Cleveland offices together on the fourth, fifth, and a portion of the sixth floor of the Penton Media Building. AECOM also purchased branding rights, changing the name from Penton Media Building to AECOM Building.

The AECOM Building is similar in appearance to New York City's One Liberty Plaza and Chicago's Richard J. Daley Center.

== See also ==
- List of tallest buildings in Cleveland
- AECOM
- Penton Media
