= Frank P. Pulley =

American politician

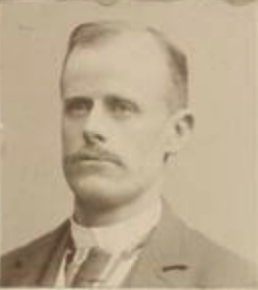

Member of the Virginia House of Delegates from Southampton County
- In office December 2, 1891 – December 6, 1893

Personal details
- Born: Franklin Pierce Pulley; July 8, 1852 Isle of Wight, Virginia, U.S.
- Died: April 20, 1928 (aged 75) Ivor, Virginia, U.S.
- Party: Democratic
- Spouse: Cora Stephenson

Franklin Pierce Pulley (July 8, 1852 – April 20, 1928) was an American politician who served in the Virginia House of Delegates.
