= The Statler (Cleveland) =

Historic apartment building in Ohio U.S.

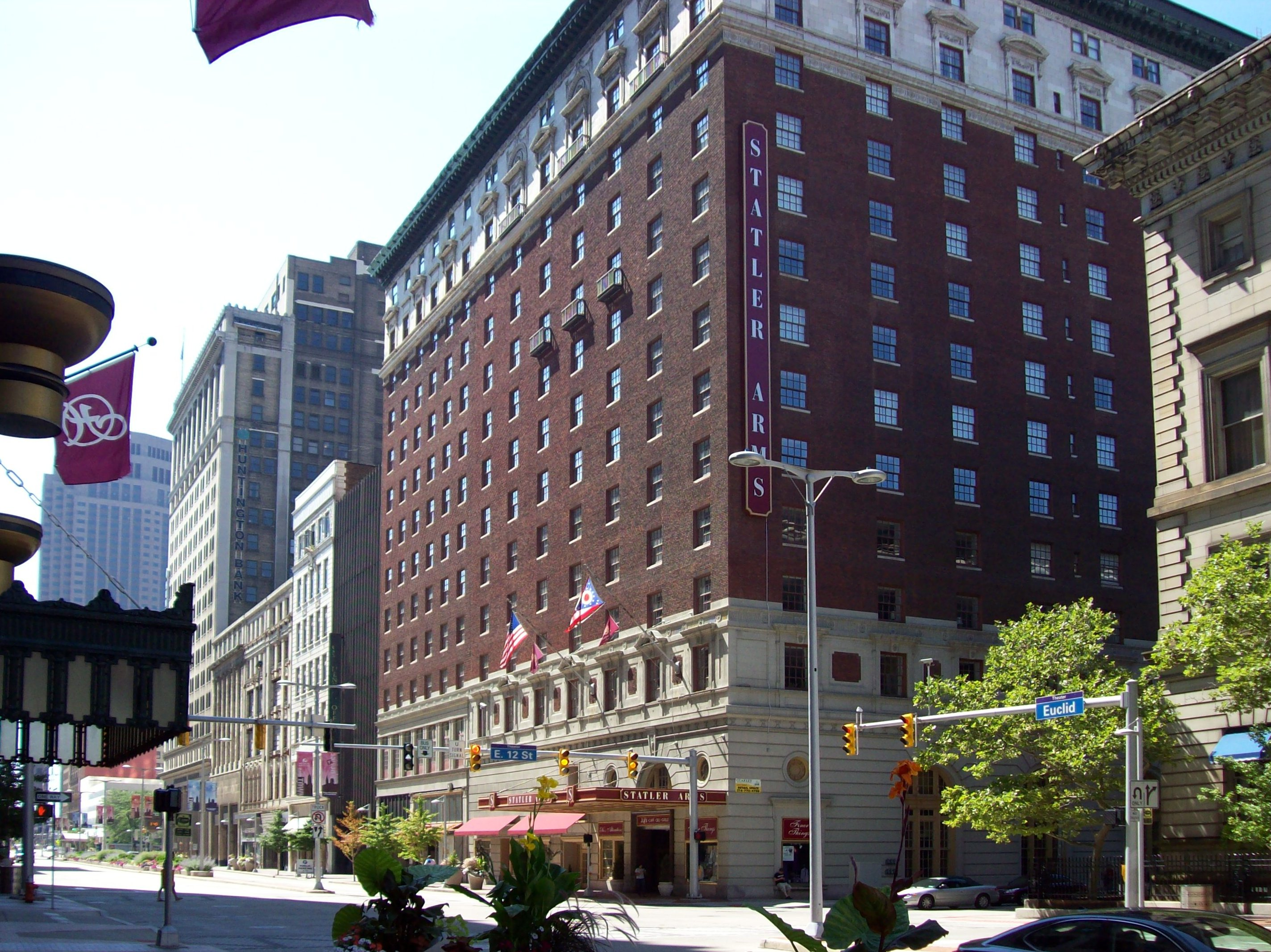
- Interactive map of the The Statler area
- Former names: Statler Arms Hotel, Hotel Statler, Cleveland, The Cleveland Plaza, The Statler Office Tower, Statler Arms Apartments

General information
- Type: Residential
- Location: 1127 Euclid Avenue Cleveland, Ohio, U.S.
- Coordinates: 41.5007°N 81.6848°W
- Construction started: 1911
- Completed: 1912

Height
- Roof: 56.7 m (186 ft)

Technical details
- Floor count: 14

Design and construction
- Architect: George B. Post & Sons

Other information
- Number of units: 295

Website
- www.thestatlercle.com
- Hotel Statler
- U.S. National Register of Historic Places
- Location: 1127 Euclid Ave., Cleveland, Ohio
- Area: less than one acre
- Architectural style: Renaissance
- NRHP reference No.: 98000317
- Added to NRHP: April 1, 1998

The Statler is a historically renovated former Statler Hotel high-rise in downtown Cleveland's Theater District at Euclid Avenue and East 12th Street, and was converted into 295 apartments in 2001. It is 192 feet (59 m) high and rises to 14 floors above the street. It was listed on the National Register of Historic Places in 1998.

== History ==
The Hotel Statler opened at Euclid and East 12th on October 12, 1912, and contained 700 rooms. The success of the Cleveland entity soon led to the opening of Statlers in Washington, D.C., Detroit, St. Louis, New York City, Hartford, Dallas, and Los Angeles. The hotel was expanded and modernized in the 1930s; these upgrades included 300 more rooms, the Terrace dining room, the new Gentlemen's Lounge, a library, and a Pompeian Room. Hilton bought the Statler Hotels chain in 1954, and the Cleveland hotel was renamed The Statler Hilton in 1958. Unfortunately, an overflow of hotel rooms in the city eventually affected the once grand hotel, and occupancy fell. Beginning in 1971, several floors of the enormous building were converted to use as an office building. Hilton continued to manage the property until 1973, when it was renamed The Cleveland Plaza. In 1980, the hotel was sold to investor Carl Milstein, who converted it entirely to an office building, The Statler Office Tower. It was converted to an apartment building, Statler Arms Apartments, in 2001. After a 2019 renovation, the name changed to The Statler. It is now affiliated with the Century Modern Collection brand of luxury apartments.
