= The Centennial (Cleveland) =

High-rise office building in the Nine-Twelve District of downtown Cleveland, Ohio

Coordinates: 41°30′1.91″N 81°41′11.84″W

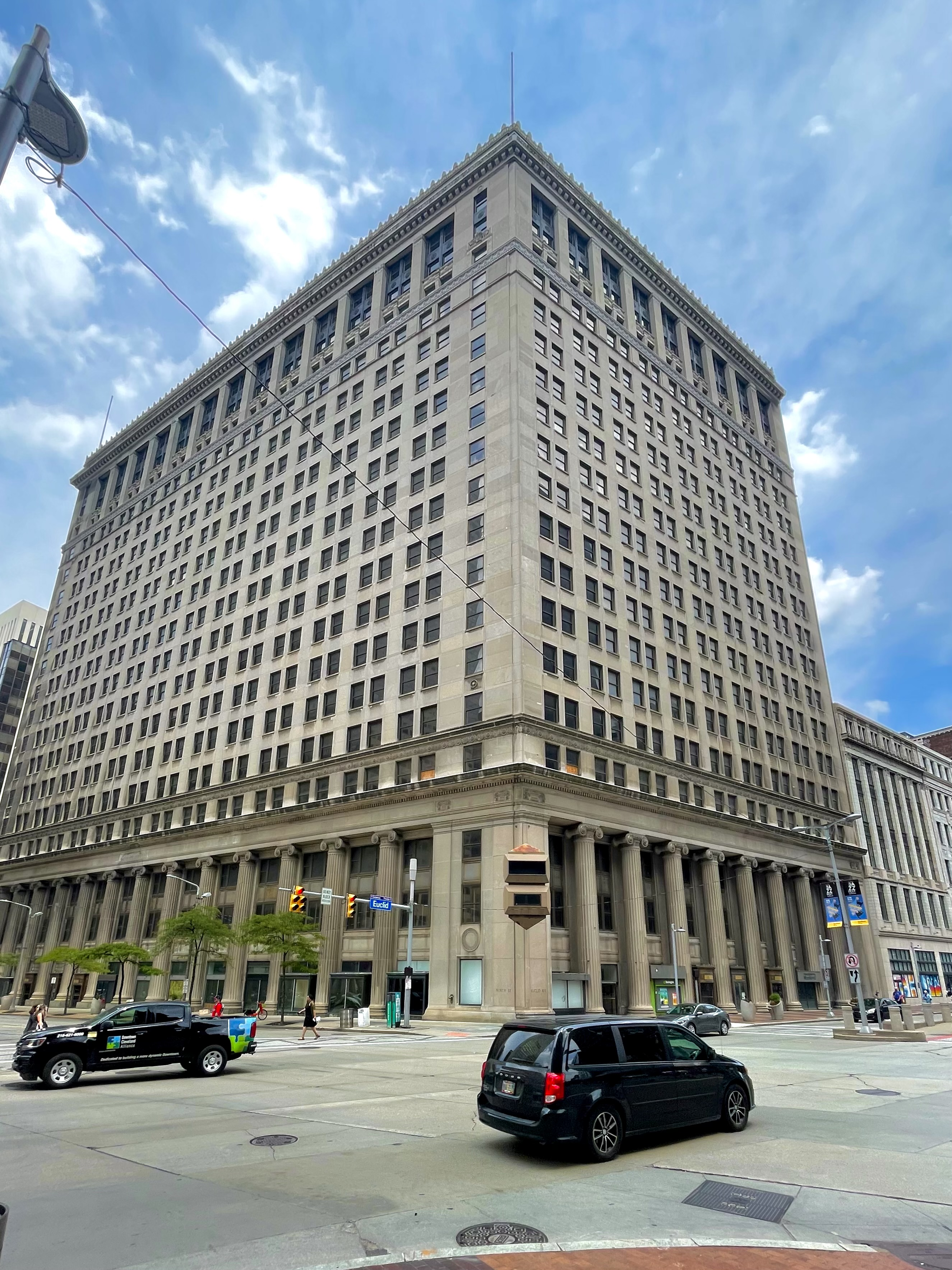
- The former Huntington Bank Building
- Interactive map of the The Centennial area
- Former names: Union Commerce Bank Building

General information
- Type: Office/Hotel/Retail/Residential (Mixed Use)
- Location: 925 Euclid Avenue Cleveland, Ohio 44115 United States
- Construction started: 1921
- Completed: 1924
- Cost: 12.234 Million

Height
- Roof: 88.09 m (289 ft)

Technical details
- Floor count: 21
- Floor area: over 1,000,000 sq. ft.

Design and construction
- Architect: Graham, Anderson, Probst & White

The Centennial, formerly The 925 Building, Huntington Building, Union Commerce Building, originally the Union Trust Building, is a high-rise office building on Euclid Avenue in the Nine-Twelve District of downtown Cleveland, Ohio, USA. When the building was completed in 1924, it was the second largest building in the world in terms of floor space, with more than 30 acres (12 hectares) of floor space. It also included the world's largest bank lobby, which today remains among the largest in the world. The lobby features enormous marble Corinthian columns, barrel vaulted ceilings, and colorful murals by Jules Guerin.

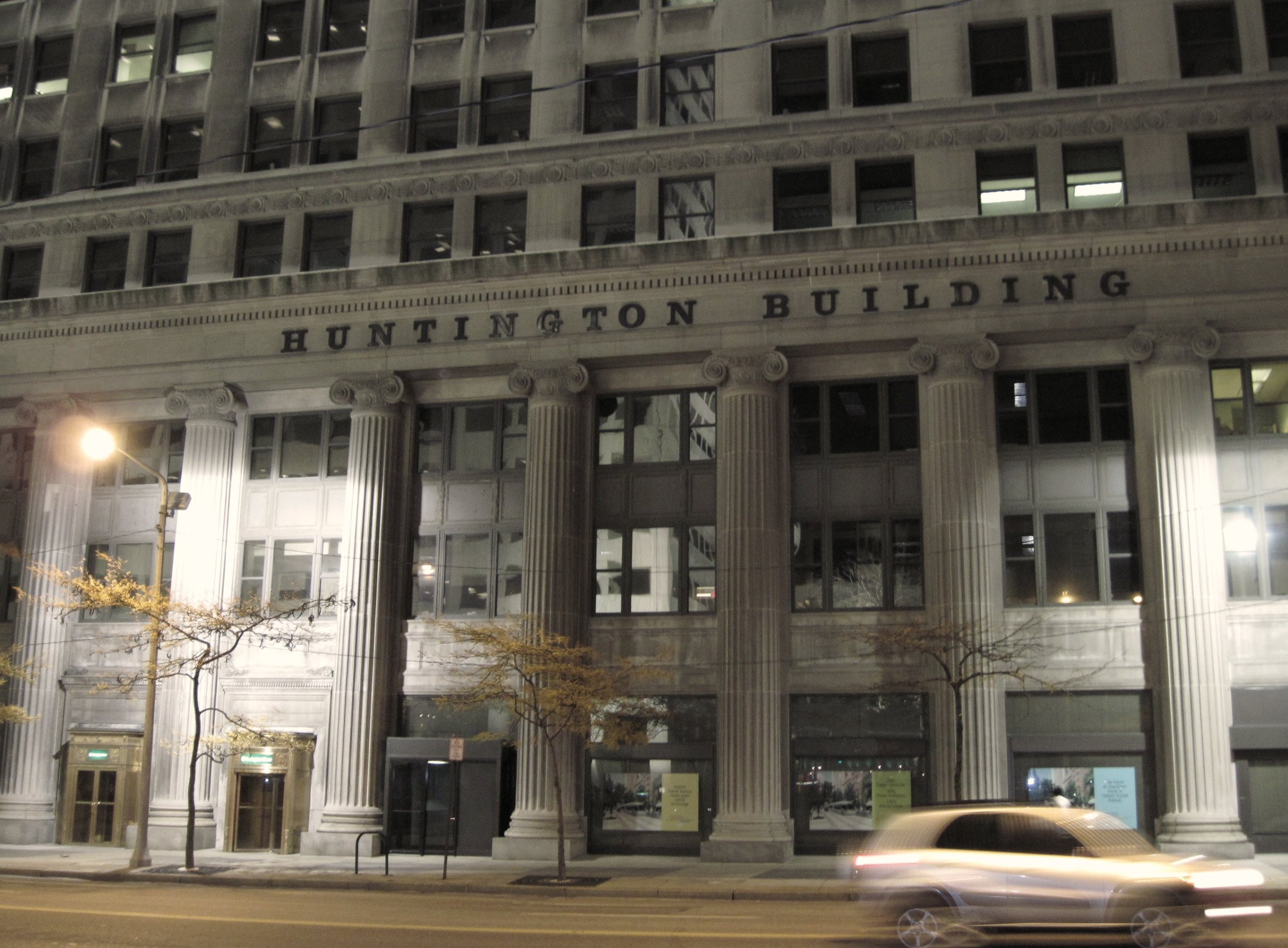
The Huntington Building's facade facing East 9th Street

== Design and history ==
The 289 foot (88 meters) tall building was designed by the firm of Graham, Anderson, Probst & White, who were also responsible for the design of the Terminal Tower. It was renovated in 1975 under the direction of Cleveland architect Peter van Dijk, and again by Hines Properties in 1991. In June 2010 it was purchased for $18.5 million by Optima International, a Miami-based real estate investment firm led by Chaim Schochet and 2/3rd owned by the Privat Group, one of Ukraine's largest business and banking groups. Originally contemplating closing the building due to a very high vacancy rate, Chaim Chochet and Chip Marous proposed in September 2014 a $231 million renovation of the building into a mixed-used facility combining offices, apartments, condominiums and a boutique hotel. In June 2015, Terry Coyne, a commercial real estate broker from Newmark, negotiated the sale to Hudson Holdings LLC for $22 million. Hudson began a $280 million renovation of the building which will feature 550 apartments, a 300-room, high-end hotel, 200,000 square feet of retail, a banquet hall, conference space, and a lobby open to the public.

Huntington Bank moved its regional headquarters to 200 Public Square from the Huntington Bank Building in September 2011.

On May 4, 2018, Hudson sold the property to Cleveland-based The Millennia Companies. Millennia announced in November 2018 that project would henceforth be known as The Centennial, and that the company would spend roughly $270 million renovating the structure. By May 2021 plans for The Centennial changed from luxury to affordable housing.

Huntington Bank vacated the remaining banking branch on December 1, 2023, ending the building's use as a bank after 99 years.

== See also ==
- List of tallest buildings in Cleveland
