= Heinen's =

Grocery store chain in the United States

- Type: Private
- Industry: Retail (Grocery)
- Founded: 1929
- Founder: Joseph R. Heinen
- Headquarters: Warrensville Heights, Ohio
- Key people: J. Jeffrey Heinen (COO); Thomas J. Heinen (CEO); John W. Cymanski (DOO); Maryann R. Correnti (CFO)
- Revenue: US$600-700million (2019)
- Number of employees: 4000 (2026)
- Website: www.heinens.com

Heinen's two brothers brand

Heinen's is an American family-owned and operated regional supermarket chain that was founded in 1929. The chain has locations in Northeast Ohio and in the Chicago metropolitan area. It was founded by Joe Heinen, a butcher, who opened the first store near his butcher shop. The company now operates under the leadership of his grandsons Jeff and Tom Heinen and their children also hold key roles at the Corporate Office. Currently, Kim Heinen is a Director of Category Management for Private Brands, Kelsey Heinen is the Director of Prepared Foods, and Jake Heinen is a Market Manager.

== History ==
Heinen's was founded in 1929 in Cleveland, Ohio, when Joe Heinen opened a small meat market on Kinsman Road (now called Chagrin Boulevard). After running the store for a few years, Joe opened his first supermarket across the street from the original butcher shop in 1933.

On August 22, 2012, after two years of market and distribution logistics research, the company opened its first store outside the Greater Cleveland area in The Shops at Flint Creek in Barrington, Illinois, a suburb of Chicago. At that point, the chain served 18 communities in Ohio and Illinois.

On December 21, 2012, news came that the company had entered into a preliminary agreement with the Village of Glenview, Illinois, to build a new Heinen's store on the site of a building formerly occupied by a Dominick's supermarket, which had closed six years earlier in 2006. The Glenview location opened May 7, 2014. In early 2014, Heinen's also agreed to terms for new locations in Lake Bluff and Bannockburn, Illinois.

In September 2013, it was announced that the company was in the final stages of negotiation with the Geis Companies for a 15-year lease on space in the Ameritrust Tower and Swetland Building at the corner of East 9th Street and Euclid Avenue in downtown Cleveland. The company was reported to have had a long-standing interest in the downtown area and had come close to a deal for space in a major development on the east bank of the Cuyahoga River just prior to the start of the Great Recession. Company leadership, while acknowledging the risks associated with the deal, was hopeful that the population in the downtown area would continue its recent upward trend and further solidify the new store's customer base. This location, occupying the first two floors of the building and the first floor of the neighboring Swetland Building, opened on February 25, 2015. The company closed the location on July 31, 2026.

As of 2016 Heinen's had 24 stores, 19 in Ohio and five in Illinois.
