= Amazon Breakthrough Novel Award =

Literary award

The Amazon Breakthrough Novel Award (ABNA) was a contest sponsored by Amazon.com, Penguin Group, Hewlett Packard, CreateSpace and BookSurge to publish and promote a manuscript by an unknown or unpublished author. The first award was given in 2008 and in 2015 Amazon announced that they would not be continuing the award and would instead focus on the Kindle Scout program.

== Judging process ==
After the initial submission period is over, the contest is made up of five rounds:

- Round One: Each contestant must submit a short pitch about their novel, with selected Amazon editors judging the pitch on its quality, strength and originality. The editors will select up to 1,000 pitches from each category to progress to the second round.
- Round Two: Excerpts from each novel will be read, reviewed and rated by Amazon editors and top reviewers. They will be judged on a scale of one (poor) to five (excellent) based on the excerpt's overall strength, prose, style, plot, hook and the originality of the excerpt. 250 novels will be selected from both categories to progress to the quarter-finals.
- Quarter-finals: The entrants progressing to this category will have both their excerpts as well as the reviews from round two posted on Amazon for reading and reviewing. However, the judging for this category is done by Publishers Weekly reviewers who will select the top 50 entries from each category to progress to the semi-finals.
- Semi-finals: At this round the top 50 entries will be judged by a panel of judges selected by the publishing company Penguin, who will choose the top 3 entries for each category to progress to the finals.
- Finalist Period: During this round the top excerpts for each category will be posted on the main ABNA page with links for the Amazon customer to vote for their chosen entry. Each contestant will also receive a review from a celebrity panel consisting of "at least one well-known author, one agent, and one editor." The winner of the contest will be announced at an awards ceremony held in the city of Amazon's choosing.

== 2008 competition ==
Amazon introduced the Breakthrough Novel Award in 2007. The first competition began in late 2007 and ended in early 2008. A maximum of 5,000 manuscripts were accepted during the contest period, which ran between October 1, 2007 and November 5, 2007. In mid-January 2008, up to 836 authors were selected as semi-finalists and received a capsule review of their manuscript from Publishers Weekly. On February 19, 2008, 100 semi-finalists had their manuscripts read by Penguin editors.

On March 3, 2008, the top ten finalists were announced. All received a prize package from HP and a self-publishing package from BookSurge.

- The Hellraiser of Hollywood Hills by Jennifer Colt
- Casting Off by Nicole R. Dickson
- Bad Things Happen by Harry Dolan
- The Wet Nurse's Tale by Erica Eisdorfer
- The Butterflies of Grand Canyon by Margaret Erhart
- Ring of Lies by Karen Laugel
- Fresh Kills by Bill Loehfelm
- Motherless Children by Randall Luce
- The Prospect of My Arrival by Dwight Okita
- Wrecking Civilization Before Lunch by John Ring

Amazon customers voted to pick the grand-prize winner. The top three received a trip to New York City. On April 7, 2008, Fresh Kills by Bill Loehfelm was announced as the first winner of the Amazon Breakthrough Novel Award. Loehfelm won a larger prize package from HP and a $25,000 advance on a publishing contract with Penguin.

== 2009 competition ==
In late 2008, Amazon started taking in entries for the 2009 ABNA awards. The judges for the year were announced to be Sue Grafton, Sue Monk Kidd, Barney Karpfinger, and Eamon Dolan. Finalists were announced May 15, 2009.

Finalists

- Bill Warrington's Last Chance by James King
- In Malice, Quite Close by Brandi Lynn Ryder
- Stuff of Legends by Ian Gibson

On May 27, 2009, Bill Warrington's Last Chance by James King was announced as the winner of that year's contest. King received a publishing contract that included a $25,000 advance. Bill Warrington's Last Chance was published by Viking, an imprint of Penguin Group (USA).

Sue Grafton, New York Times-bestselling author, said about the winning entry, "This is what reading is about and what a good book is supposed to do."

== 2010 competition ==
On January 25, 2010, Amazon began to accept submissions for that year's contest. Amazon announced that for the 2010 competition they awarding grand prizes in two categories, young adult and general fiction. They would also limit the top finalists to three in each category, with six finalists total for both categories. Another change from the previous competition was that the total amount of submissions allowed entry was raised to 10,000 entrants, double the amount of the 2008 competition.

The top six finalists for the 2010 competition were announced on May 25, 2010, with Amazon customers voted for the grand-prize winner for each category.

Young Adult Fiction

- Sign Language by Amy Ackley
- Service of the Crown by Alex Airdale (later retitled The Cadet of Tildor and published under the name "Alex Lidell")
- Days Like This by Alison Stewart

General Fiction

- Fortune Cookies by Jennifer Handford (later retitled Daughters for a Time)
- Farishta by Patricia McArdle
- Dove Season by Johnny Shaw (later released from Amazon Encore)

On June 14, 2010, Amazon announced the winner of the 2010 ABNA. Patricia McArdle (Farishta) and Amy Ackley (Sign Language) were announced the winners of their respective categories, each winning a publishing contract with Penguin as well as a $15,000 advance on their first book.

== 2011 competition ==
On January 25, 2011, Amazon once again began to accept submissions with the eliminations being made between the months of February and June 2011. The top six finalists for the competition were announced on May 26, 2011, with the winners announced on June 15, 2011. The winners were announced as Jill Baguchinsky for Spookygirl (young adult) and Gregory Hill for East of Denver (general fiction).

Young Adult Fiction

- Spookygirl by Jill Baguchinsky
- Lost in Thought by Cara Bertrand
- Devolution by Richard Larson

General Fiction

- East of Denver by Gregory Hill
- Dog Christ by Lucian Morgan
- I Am Livia by Phyllis T. Smith

== 2012 competition ==
In late 2011 Amazon and Penguin Group (USA) released details of the 2012 Amazon Breakthrough Novel Award, with the dates for the elimination rounds being the same as the previous year. While the previous years' winners had all been residents of the United States of America, the 2012 contest would be open to international contestants' entries.

The top six finalists for the 2012 competition were announced on May 22, 2012. On June 17 the winners were announced, with Alan Averill winning the award for general fiction and Regina Sirois winning the award for young adult.

General Literature

- The Beautiful Land by Alan Averill
- Grace Humiston and the Vanishing by Charles Kelly
- A Chant of Love and Lamentation by Brian Reeves

Young Adult Fiction

- Dreamcatchers by Cassandra Griffin
- Out of Nowhere by Rebecca Phillips
- On Little Wings by Regina Sirois

== 2013 competition ==
In December 2012, Amazon announced the details of the 2013 competition. There were 10,000 starting entries, and the elimination process was similar to last year, until the end where they ran a Final 5 round and announced the winner through an online vote. The semi-finalists are shown here:

General literature
It Happened in Wisconsin by Ken Moraff
Young Adult Fiction
Timebound by Rysa Walker
Romance
A Man Above Reproach by Evelyn Pryce
Mystery/Thriller
The Hidden by Jo Chumas
Science Fiction/Fantasy/Horror
Poe by J. Lincoln Fenn

On June 15, 2013 at a convention in Seattle, Washington, it was announced that Timebound by Rysa Walker won the Amazon Breakthrough Novel Award for 2013. Walker received a $50,000 advance and a contract with Skyscape Publishing. On January 17, Amazon announced that the Seventh Amazon Breakthrough Novel Award will open to submissions on February 16, 2014.

== 2014 competition ==
In January 2014, Amazon announced the details of the 2014 competition. The contest opened to submissions on Sunday, February 16, 2014 and the entry period closed at the end of the day on March 2, 2014. Authors were able to submit work in one of five categories: general fiction, mystery/thriller, romance, science fiction/fantasy/horror, and young adult fiction.

Amazon Publishing announced the entries moving on to the second round of the 2014 competition on March 18, 2014. Approximately 20% of 10,000 entries moved on to the second round, 400 in each of the five categories. On April 16, 2014, Amazon Publishing announced the top 100 entries in each of the five categories, and thus 500 total entries advanced to the quarter-finals. Reviewers from Publishers Weekly chose five entries in each of the five categories (25 total) to advance to the semi-finals.

A finalist was chosen from each of the five categories. Of those five finalists, one Grand Prize winner received a negotiable Amazon Publishing contract and a $50,000 advance, while each of the other four finalists received a non-negotiable Amazon Publishing contract and a $15,000 advance.

The finalists were:

General Fiction
A Pledge of Silence by Flora J. Solomon
Mystery/Thriller
The Dead Key by D.M. Pulley
Romance
The Bluestocking and the Rake by Norma Darcy
Science Fiction/Fantasy/Horror
The Mengele Effect (renamed to The Gemini Effect) by Chuck Grossart
Young Adult Fiction
Seashell, Stork and Apple Tree (renamed to The Mermaid's Sister) by Carrie Anne Noble

On July 21, 2014, it was announced that The Dead Key by D.M. Pulley won the Amazon Breakthrough Novel Award for 2014.
