= Ernest R. Graham (architect) =

American architect

Ernest Robert Graham
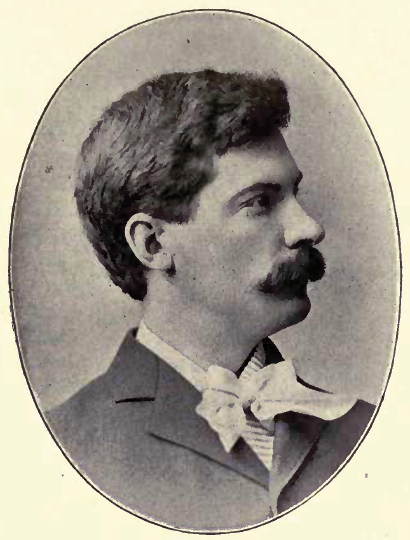
- Born: August 22, 1868; Lowell, Michigan
- Died: November 22, 1936 (aged 68); Chicago, Illinois
- Occupation: Architect
- Practice: Graham, Anderson, Probst & White
- Buildings: National Postal Museum, Equitable Building, Union Station (Washington, D.C.), Terminal Tower

Ernest Robert Graham (August 22, 1868 — November 22, 1936) was an American architect.

== Biography ==
Graham was born in Lowell, Kent County, Michigan, the son of Robert William and Emma Elizabeth (Post) Graham. Employed first by Burnham and Root in Chicago, then by D.H. Burnham & Co., Graham was involved in the engineering and design of Chicago's Columbian Exposition of 1893. He was a co-founder of Graham, Anderson, Probst & White, the successor firm to Daniel Burnham's practice. Graham designed the National Postal Museum in Washington, D.C., and the Equitable Building in New York City, among many others.

According to an obituary in The New York Times (November 23, 1936, page 21, column 1): "For nearly half a century, he was one of the great builders of Chicago." Among the buildings that Graham planned or contributed to in Chicago were the Merchandise Mart, Field Building (now the LaSalle Bank Building), Wrigley Building, Field Museum of Natural History reconstruction, Shedd Aquarium, Continental Illinois Bank Building, Union Station, Marshall Field & Company Stores, the old Chicago Main Post Office Building, Pittsfield Building, State Bank of Chicago Building, and the Civic Opera House.

Graham also designed many noteworthy structures in other cities. These included the Equitable Building, Chase National Bank, and 80 Maiden Lane in New York City; Union Station and the General Post Office in Washington, D.C., and the Union Trust, Union Station and Terminal Tower Building in Cleveland.

== Personal life ==
Graham married Carlotta Vonwagonen (Jackson) Hull in 1893. Carlotta died in 1923. He married his second wife, Ruby Fitzhugh (Powell) Leffingwell, in 1925 at Stokes Poges Church, England. He adopted her son, William E. Leffingwell. Graham is the uncle of Robert Klark Graham, founder of the controversial "Nobel Sperm Bank".

== Death ==
He died on November 22, 1936, at his home at 25 Banks Street, Chicago, Illinois, aged 68.
