= Burnham Center =

Office skyscraper in Chicago, Illinois

- Conway Building
- U.S. National Register of Historic Places
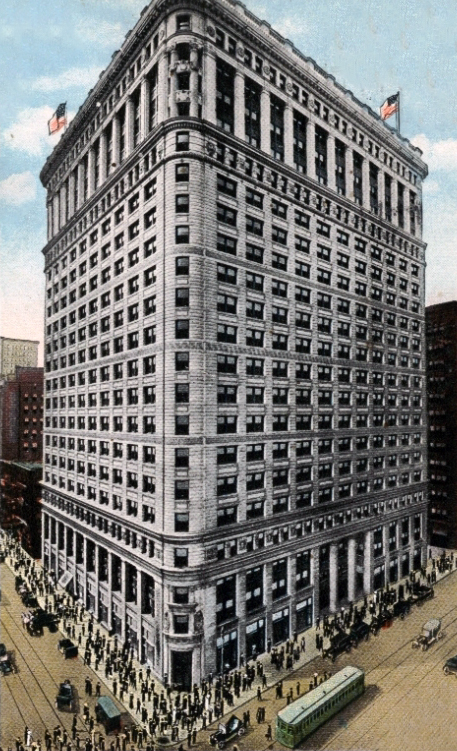

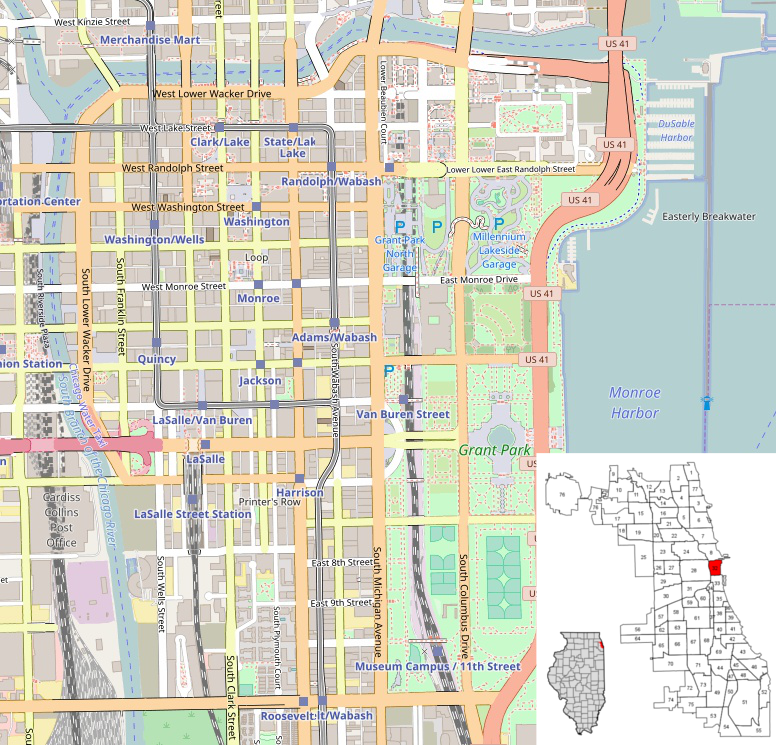
- Location within Chicago Loop
- Location: 111 W. Washington St., Chicago, Illinois
- Coordinates: 41°52′58″N 87°37′53″W
- Built: 1913
- Architect: Daniel H. Burnham & Co.; Graham, Burnham, & Co.
- Architectural style: Beaux Arts
- NRHP reference No.: 84000988
- Added to NRHP: February 9, 1984

The Burnham Center, originally known as the Conway Building and later as the Chicago Title & Trust Building, is a historic skyscraper in Chicago, Illinois. Built with funds from the Marshall Field estate, it was the last building designed by Daniel Burnham before his death on June 1, 1912, and was completed in 1913.

== History ==
The Burnham Center, originally known as the Conway Building, replaced the Chicago Opera House, which had been built in 1885. The Conway was a real estate project resulting from the estate of Marshall Field, who had died in 1906. Field requested that his $83 million estate be invested in Chicago real estate until his grandson, Marshall Field III, turned fifty (1943). For the most part, Field's estate was invested in existing property, but it was used to fund three major projects: the Conway Building, the Pittsfield Building (1927), and the Field Building (1934).

Daniel Burnham was a frequent associate of Field, designing an annex to the Marshall Field and Company Building (1892) and the Field Museum of Natural History (c. 1900). Burnham, with Frederick P. Dinkelberg, completed his design for the building shortly before leaving Chicago in April 1912; he died in Germany two months later. The building resembles Burnham's Flatiron Building in New York City: both buildings are twenty-one stories, have rounded corners, and are decorated in a Beaux-Arts style. Both buildings are thought to be influenced by the Palazzo di Propaganda Fide in Rome. Ernest R. Graham, Peirce Anderson, and Edward Probst assumed control of the project on April 30. It was completed under the auspices of Graham, Burnham & Co. (a precursor of Graham, Anderson, Probst & White) in 1913.

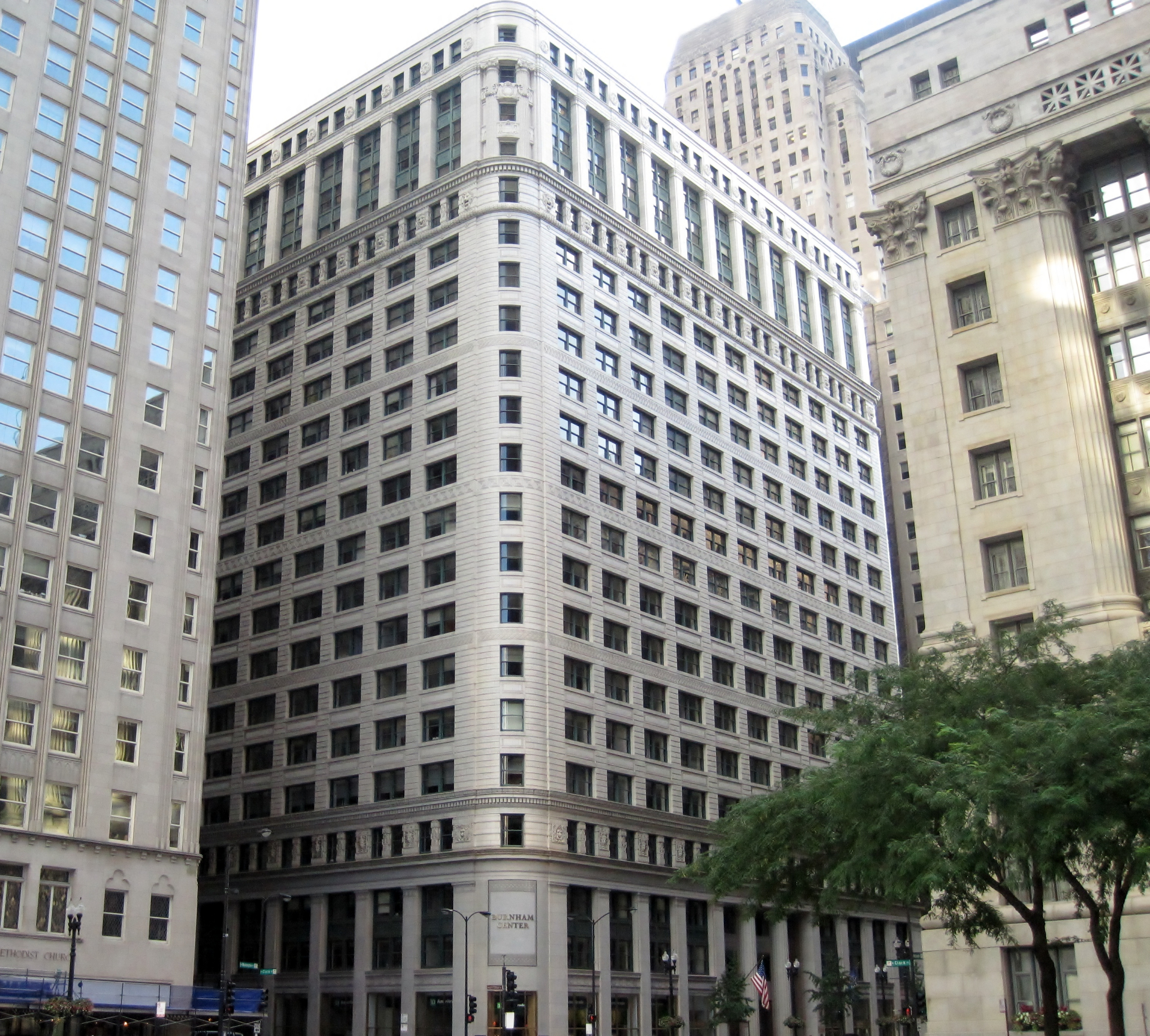
Burnham Center in 2010

The building was recognized by the National Park Service with a listing on the National Register of Historic Places on February 9, 1984. The Chicago Title & Trust Co. was a longtime tenant before the 1992 completion of the Chicago Title and Trust Center. Their former headquarters then became known as the Burnham Center.

The Burnham Center is currently home to the corporate headquarters of Grubhub.
