= Graham, Anderson, Probst & White =

American architectural firm

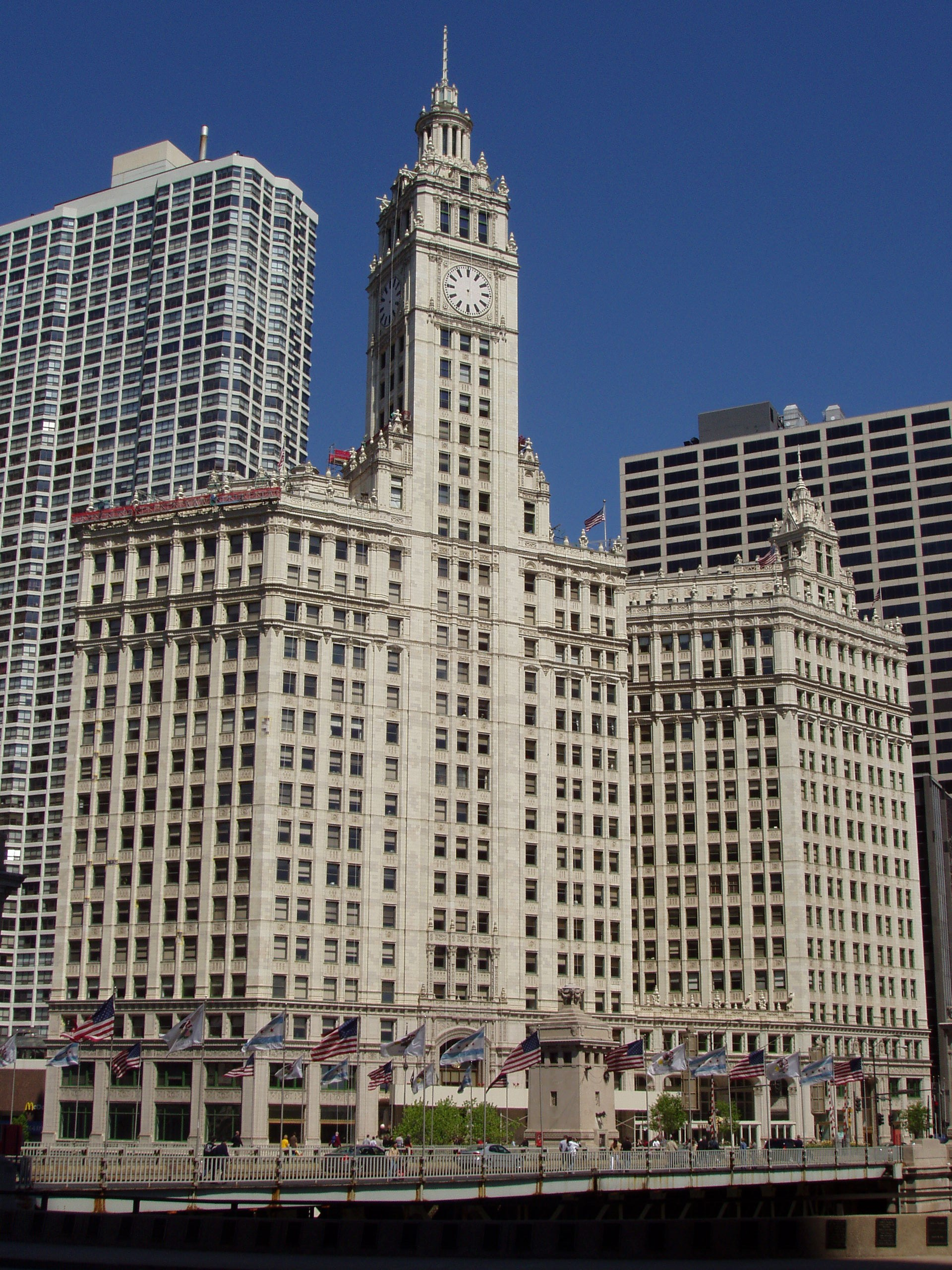
Wrigley Building, Chicago

Graham, Anderson, Probst & White (GAP&W) was a Chicago-based architectural firm that was founded in 1912 as Graham, Burnham & Co. This firm was the successor to D. H. Burnham & Co. through Daniel Burnham's surviving partner, Ernest R. Graham, and Burnham's sons, Hubert Burnham and Daniel Burnham Jr. In 1917, the Burnhams left to form their own practice, which eventually became Burnham Brothers, and Graham and the remaining members of Graham, Burnham & Co. – Graham, (William) Peirce Anderson, Edward Mathias Probst, and Howard Judson White – formed the resulting practice. The firm also employed Victor Andre Matteson.

== Background ==
Graham, Anderson, Probst & White was the largest architectural firm under one roof during the first half of the twentieth century. The firm's importance to Chicago's architectural legacy cannot be overstated, nor can its connection to Burnham.

The firm was headquartered in Burnham's own Railway Exchange Building. In part from its connection to Burnham, the firm captured the majority of the big commissions from 1912 to 1936, including such iconic works as the Wrigley Building, Merchandise Mart, Field Museum, Shedd Aquarium, Civic Opera House, Chicago Fed, and the former central Chicago post office. Its only close rival was the equally prolific Holabird and Root.

GAP&W also created the iconic Terminal Tower in Cleveland and Federal Reserve Bank in Kansas City.

Anderson died in 1924, with Graham and White following just weeks apart in 1936. Surviving partner Edward M. Probst took over the firm, assisted by his sons Marvin Probst and Edward E. Probst.

After Mr. Probst's death in 1942, son Marvin G. Probst took over as firm president. Edward E. Probst left the firm about 1947. Just prior to Marvin Probst's death in 1970, the firm was sold to an employee, William R. Surman. From 1970 to 1993 William Surman was president of the firm. After his death in 1993, the practice was run by his son Robert Surman till the firm closed its doors in the fall of 2006.

Early on, Graham, Anderson, Probst & White became known for its classical taste and the elegance of its Beaux-Arts-inspired output, which Louis Sullivan decried as a stylistic throwback but which nonetheless withstood multiple generations of critics. Those early buildings are still popular favorites today. However, starting in 1923 with the firm's plans for the Merchandise Mart and the Straus Building, the practice soon began to move beyond the Beaux-Arts influence of Burnham and the City Beautiful movement to the bolder, starker Art Deco style with its streamlined forms. The firm's ultimate expression of the Art Deco style was found in its design of the 1931 Field Building (later known as the La Salle Bank Building), which was a commission from the estate of department store magnate Marshall Field. It was matched that year by Holabird and Root's equally stunning Chicago Board of Trade Building. After 1931, GAP&W for the most part stopped referencing the Beaux-Arts style.

== Buildings ==
- Field Museum of Natural History (D.H. Burnham & Co., 1909–12; Graham, Burnham & Co., 1912–17; GAP&W, 1917–20)
- Conway Building, 1913 (D.H. Burnham & Co. and Graham, Burnham & Co.)
- Continental and Commercial Bank Building, 1914 (as Graham, Burnham & Co.)
- Marshall Field & Co. Annex and northeast section of main store, 1914 (as Graham, Burnham & Co.)
- Union Station (Chicago), 225 South Canal Street, 1913-25 (begun as Graham, Burnham & Co.)
- Kimball Building (a.k.a. DePaul University Lewis Center), 1917
- Wrigley Building, 1919–1925
- Union Trust Building of Cleveland (925 Building), 1920
- Federal Reserve Bank of Dallas Building (DataBank DFW1), 1921
- Federal Reserve Bank of Kansas City Building (925 Grand), 1921
- Federal Reserve Bank of Chicago Building, 1922
- Butler Brothers Warehouse Building, 1922
- 7 E. Redwood Ave, Baltimore MD (fmr Citizens National Bank of Baltimore Building, a.k.a. Union Citizens National Bank, 1922)
- Belknap Hardware and Manufacturing Building (101-23 East Main Street, Louisville, KY - now known as Waterside Building), 1923
- Straus Building (a.k.a. Continental National Insurance Building), 1923–24
- Merchandise Mart, 1923–31
- Illinois Merchants Bank Building (a.k.a. Continental Illinois Bank Building), 1924
- Chesapeake & Ohio Railway Passenger and Freight Stations, Carter Avenue between 10th and 11th Streets, Ashland, Kentucky, 1925
- John G. Shedd Aquarium, 1925–1931
- Pittsfield Building, 1926–1927
- State Line Generating Plant, 1926–29
- Terminal Tower, Public Square, Cleveland, 1926-1930
- Builders Building (a.k.a. 222 N. La Salle St.), 1927
- 208 W. Washington St., Chicago (a.k.a. Concord City Centre), 1927
- Civic Opera House, 1927–1929
- 30th Street Station, Philadelphia, 1927-1933
- Insurance Exchange Building, south section, 1928
- State Bank of Chicago Building, 1928
- Museum of Science and Industry (Chicago) reconstruction, 1928–1940
- Foreman State National Bank Building, 1930
- Northwestern National Bank Building, 1930
- Suburban Station, 16th Street at John Fitzgerald Kennedy Boulevard, Philadelphia, 1930
- Chicago, Burlington & Quincy Railroad Depot, South 10th Street, Omaha, Nebraska, renovation 1930
- Field Building (a.k.a. La Salle National Bank Building), 1931
- Mayflower Manor Apartments, Akron, 1931
- La Rabida Children's Hospital and Research Center, 1931
- U.S. Post Office Central Office, Chicago, 1932
- Chicago Historical Society Building, 1932
- Hurley Hall, University of Notre Dame, 1932
- Reyniers Life Building, University of Notre Dame, 1947
- Edens Plaza, Wilmette, Illinois, 1956
- Morton Salt Headquarters, 1956–61
- American Dental Association Building, 1965
- County Bank and Trust Co. Building, Blue Island, IL, 1965
- Hayes-Haley Hall, University of Notre Dame, 1968
- CNA Center, Chicago, 1972–1973
- Motorola World Headquarters, Schaumburg, IL 1973
- Illinois State Library, Springfield, IL 1990
- Loyola University Chicago, Administrative Offices, Forest Park, IL 1991
- 2 East Erie, Chicago, IL 2002
- Bethlehem Steel General Office Building (Former Headquarters until Martin Tower was built in the 1970s), Bethlehem, PA 1916. Currently vacant.

== Architectural sculpture ==
Like most of the other prominent architectural firms of the early 20th Century, GAP&W frequently used sculpture to decorate its building designs. As was the custom of the era GAP&W had specific artists that they preferred to work with. One in particular was New Yorker Henry Hering, who created the sculptured pediment for the Civic Opera House; a variety of details for the Field Museum of Natural History, including a variation on the Erectheum porch; and the allegorical figures Day and Night for the Great Hall of the Chicago's Union Station. As the century progressed, the firm moved away from the classical style favored by Hering and used for the firm's earlier Beaux Arts buildings to more contemporary art deco styled work, such as that attributed to sculptor Frank Jirouch on Cleveland's Midland Building.

== Gallery ==
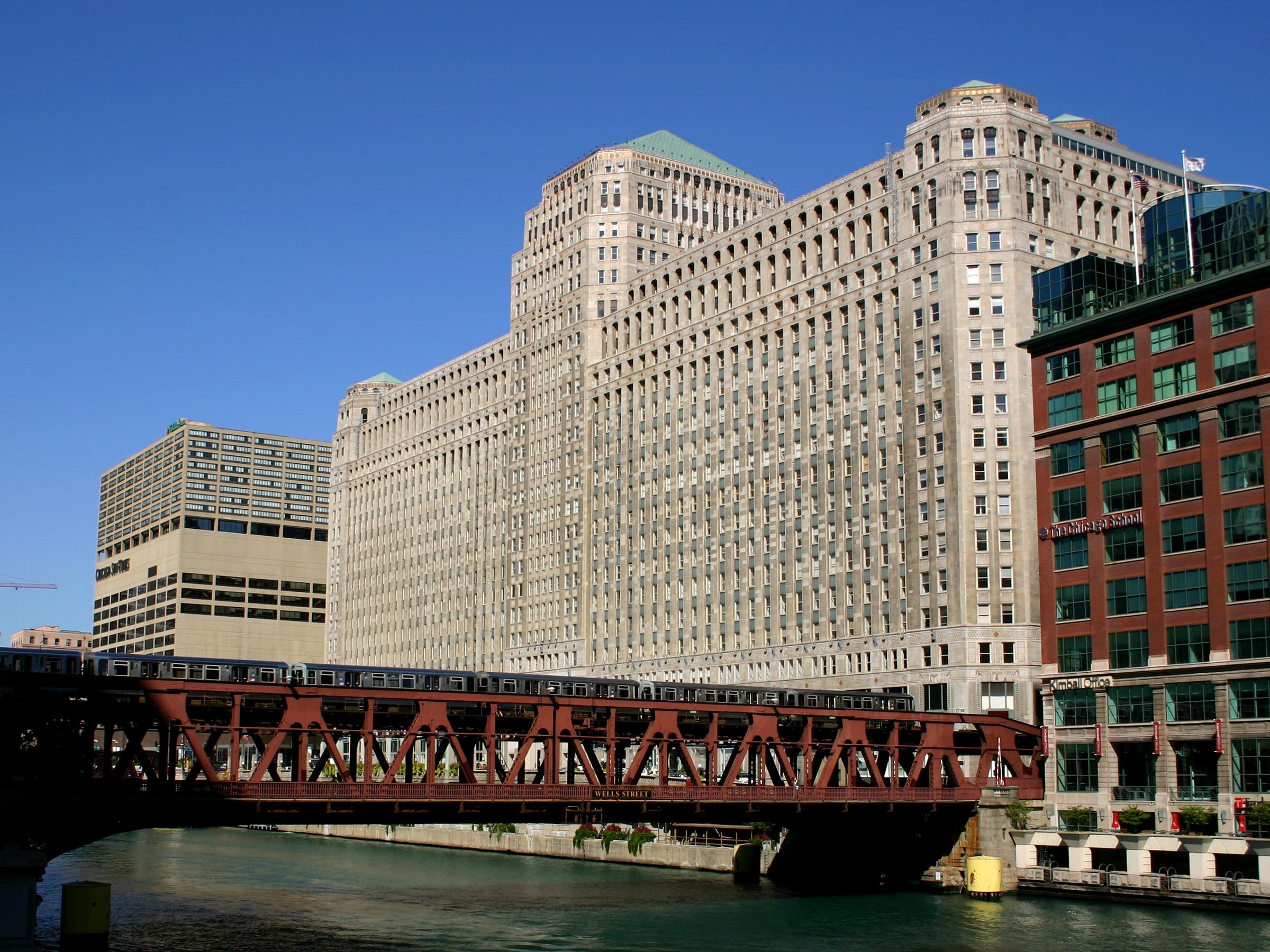
Merchandise Mart, Chicago

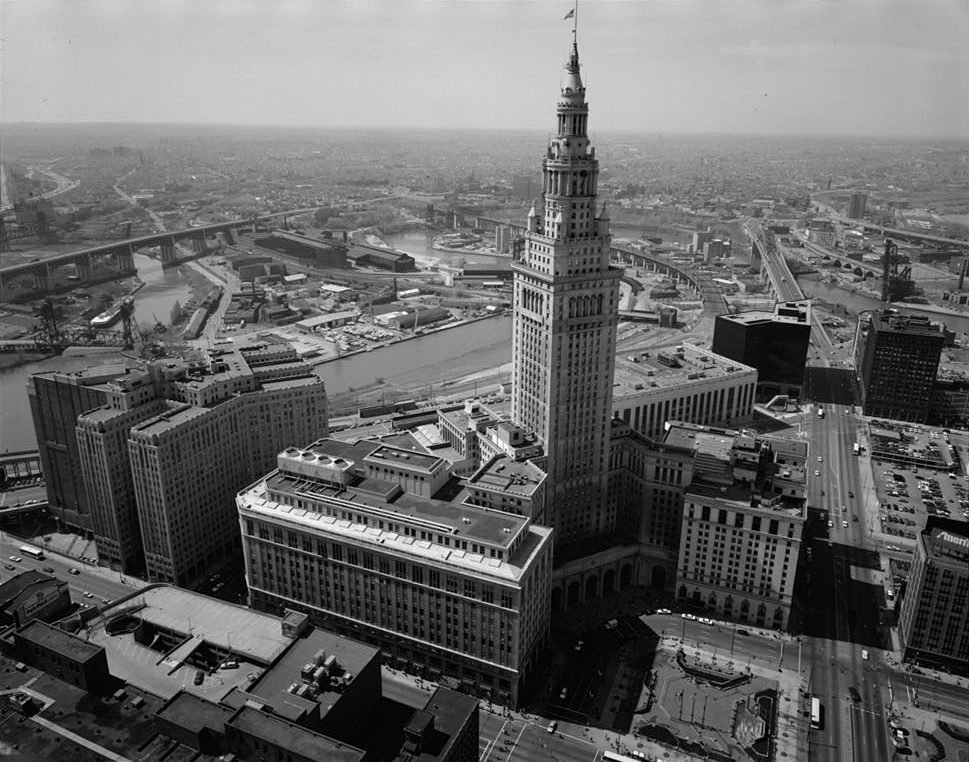
The Terminal Tower in Cleveland, Ohio.

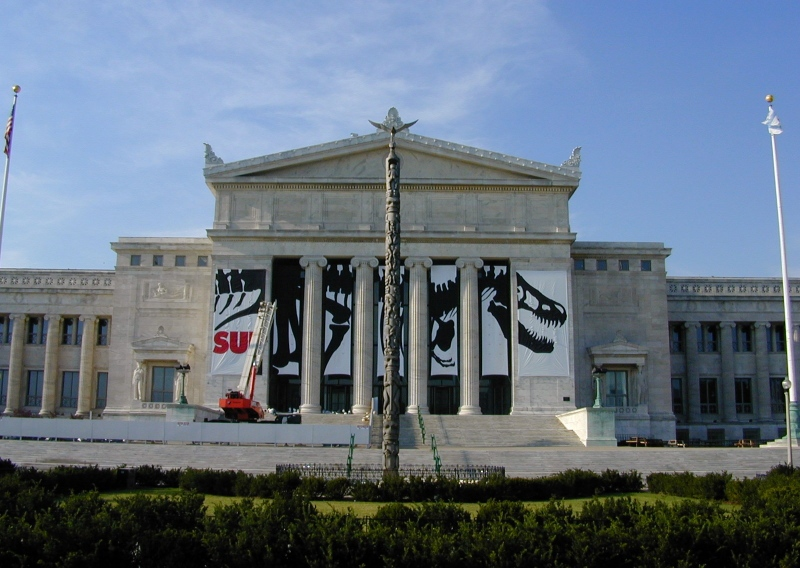
Field Museum, Chicago

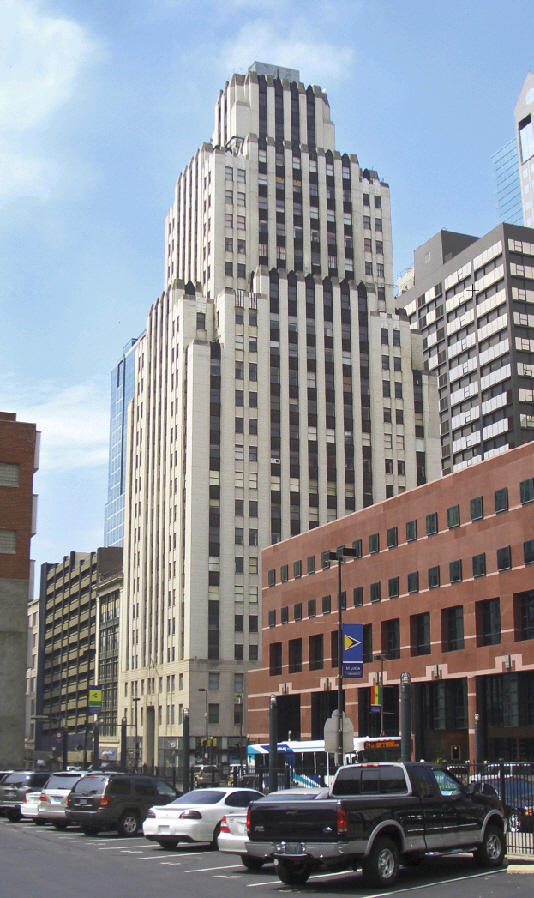
Bryant Building,
Kansas City, Missouri

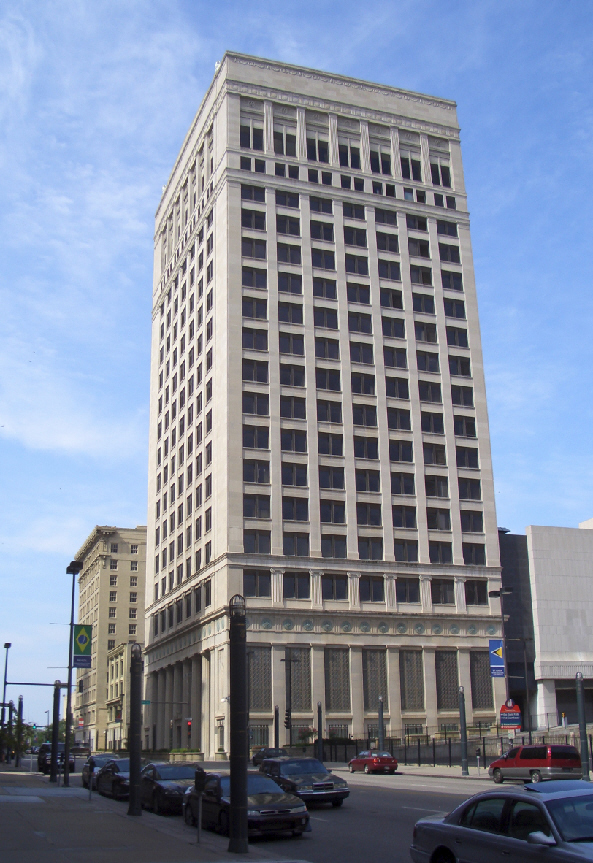
Federal Reserve Bank
of Kansas City

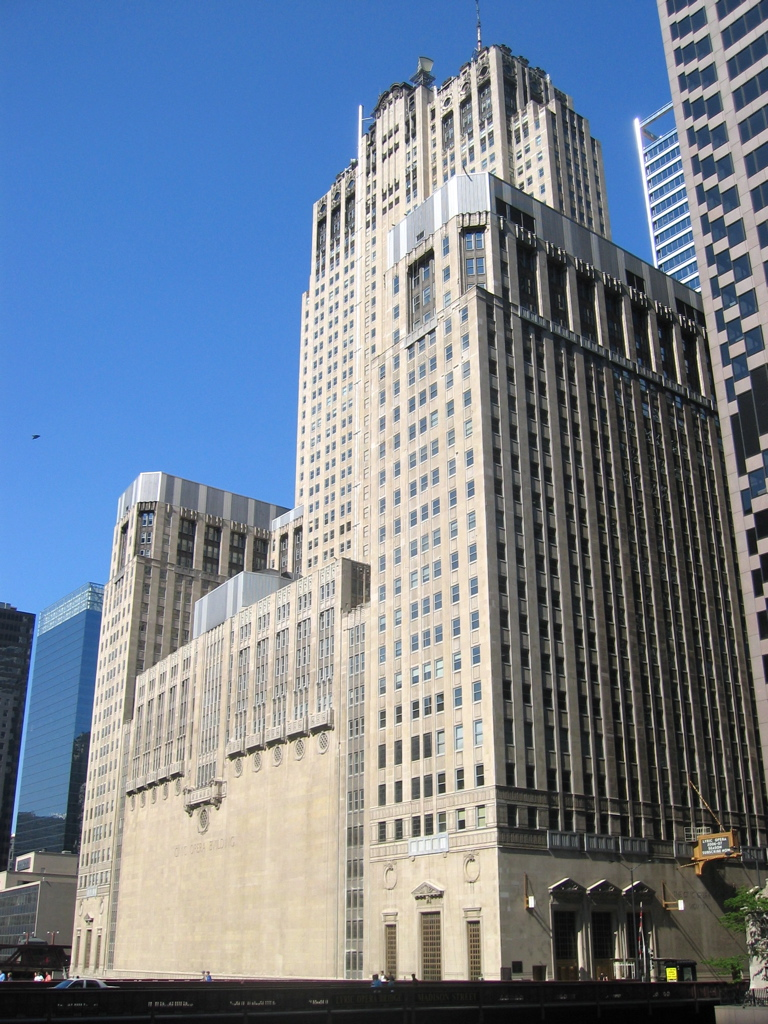
Civic Opera House, Chicago

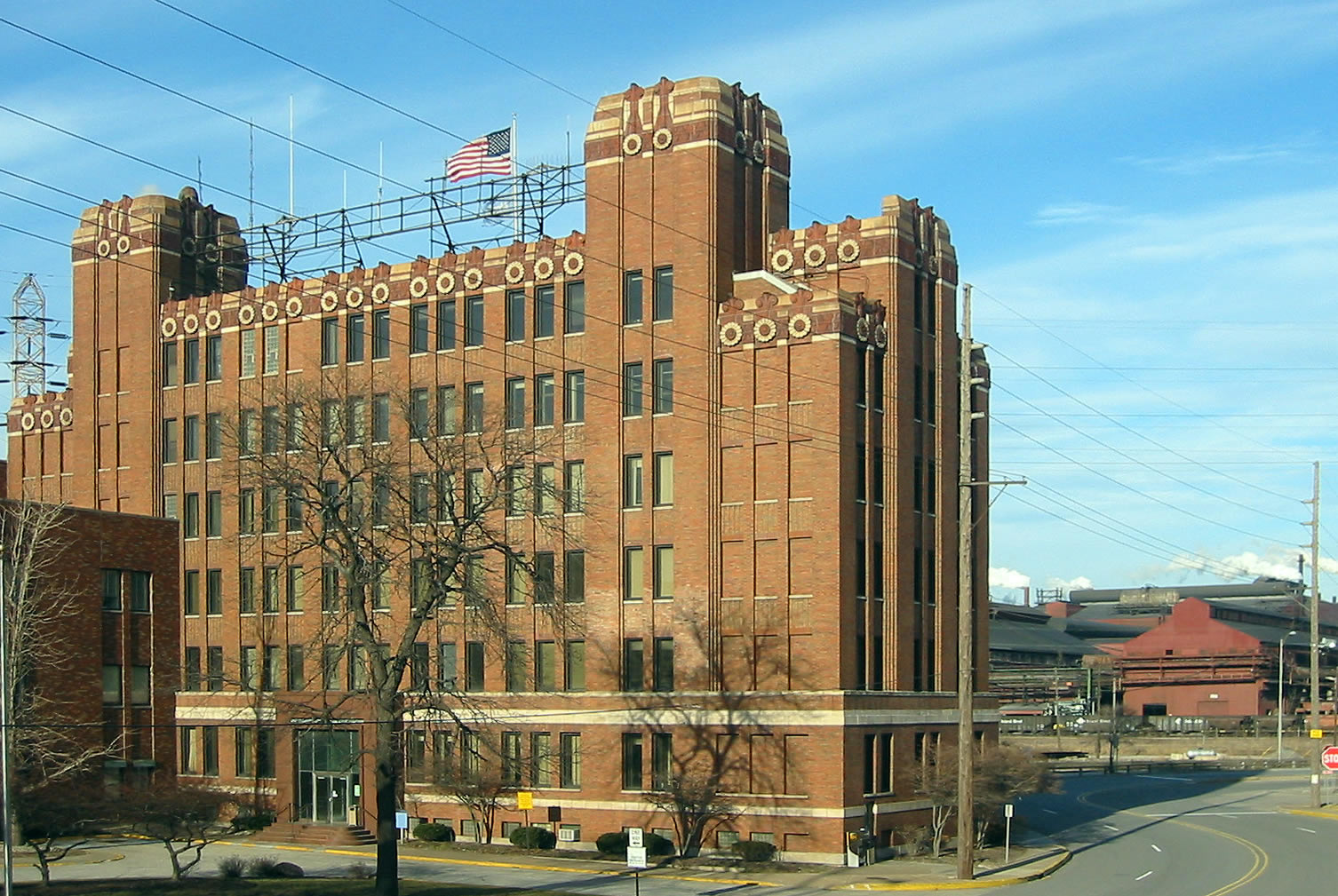
Main Office Building, Inland Steel Co., East Chicago, Indiana

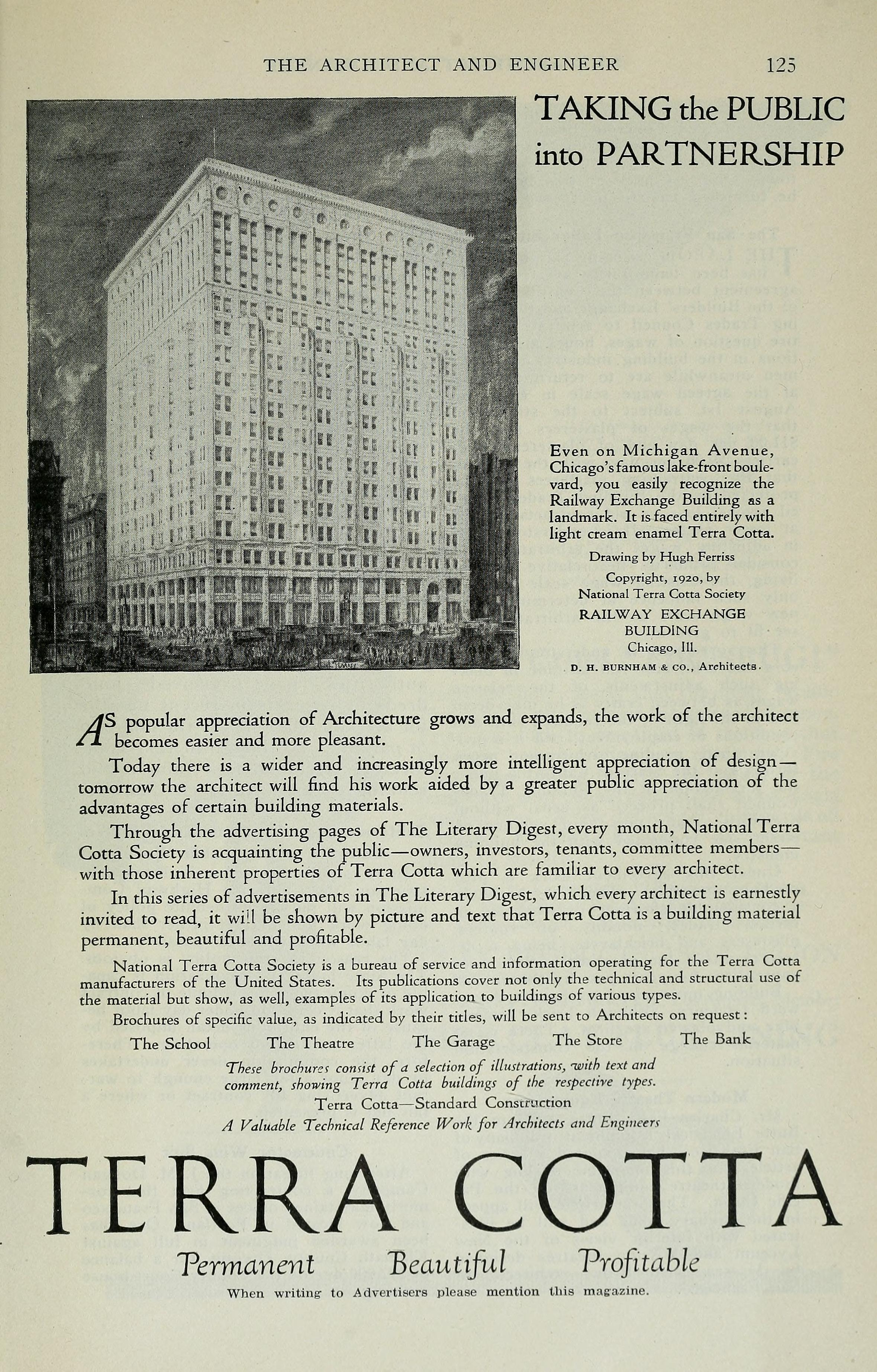
Railway Exchange Building, Chicago, Illinois

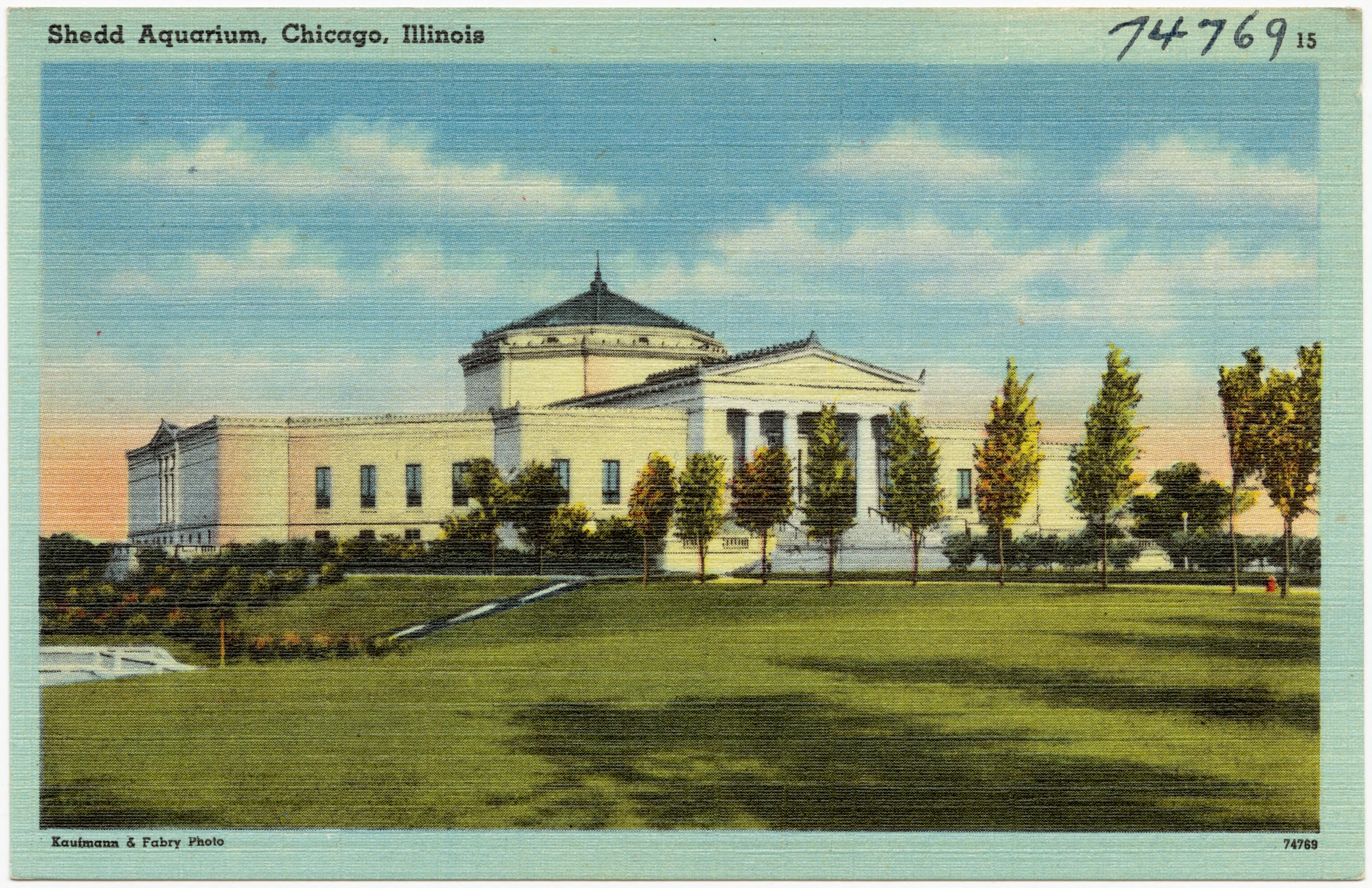
Shedd Aquarium, Chicago, Illinois

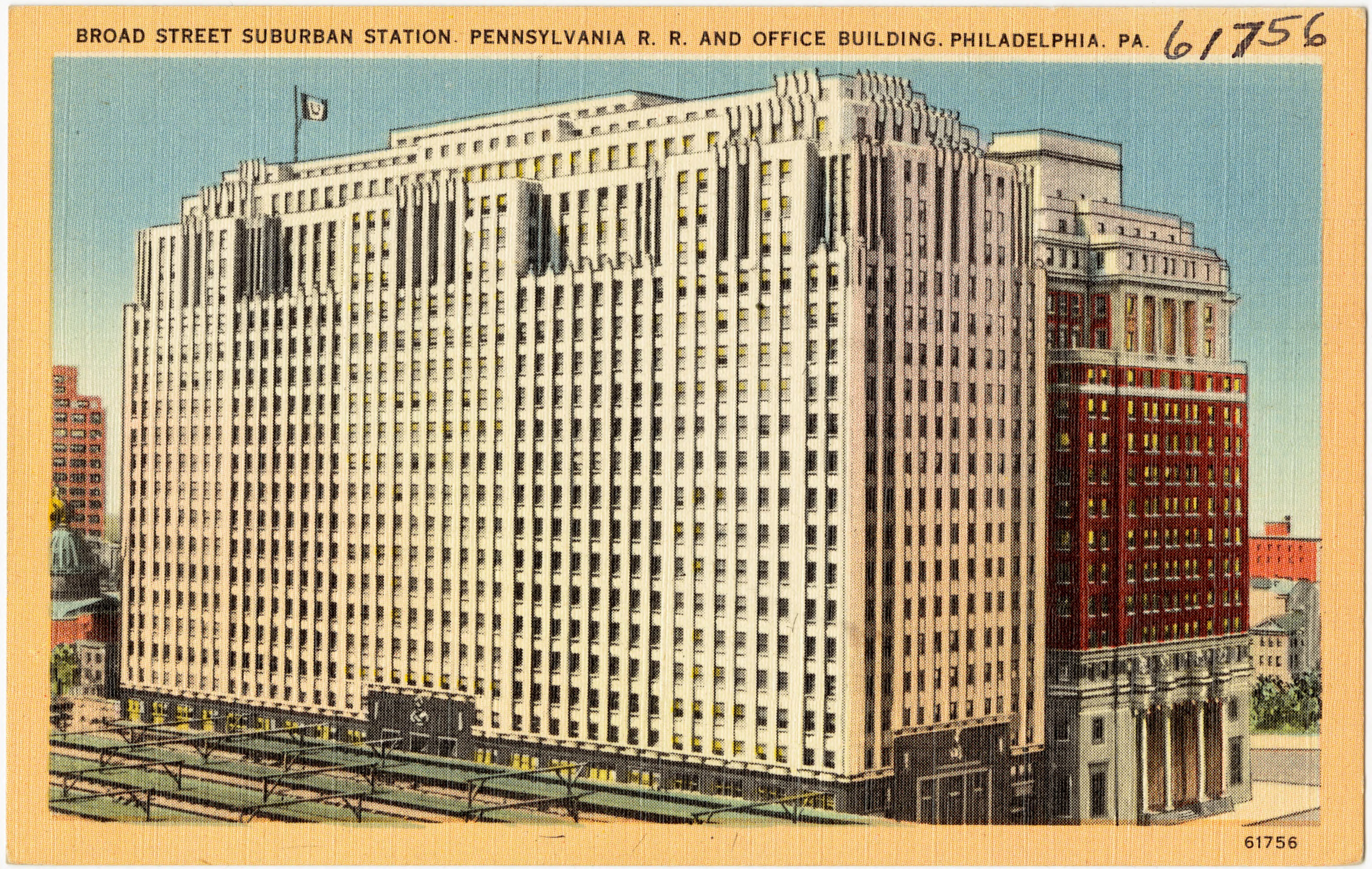
Suburban Station, Philadelphia, Pennsylvania

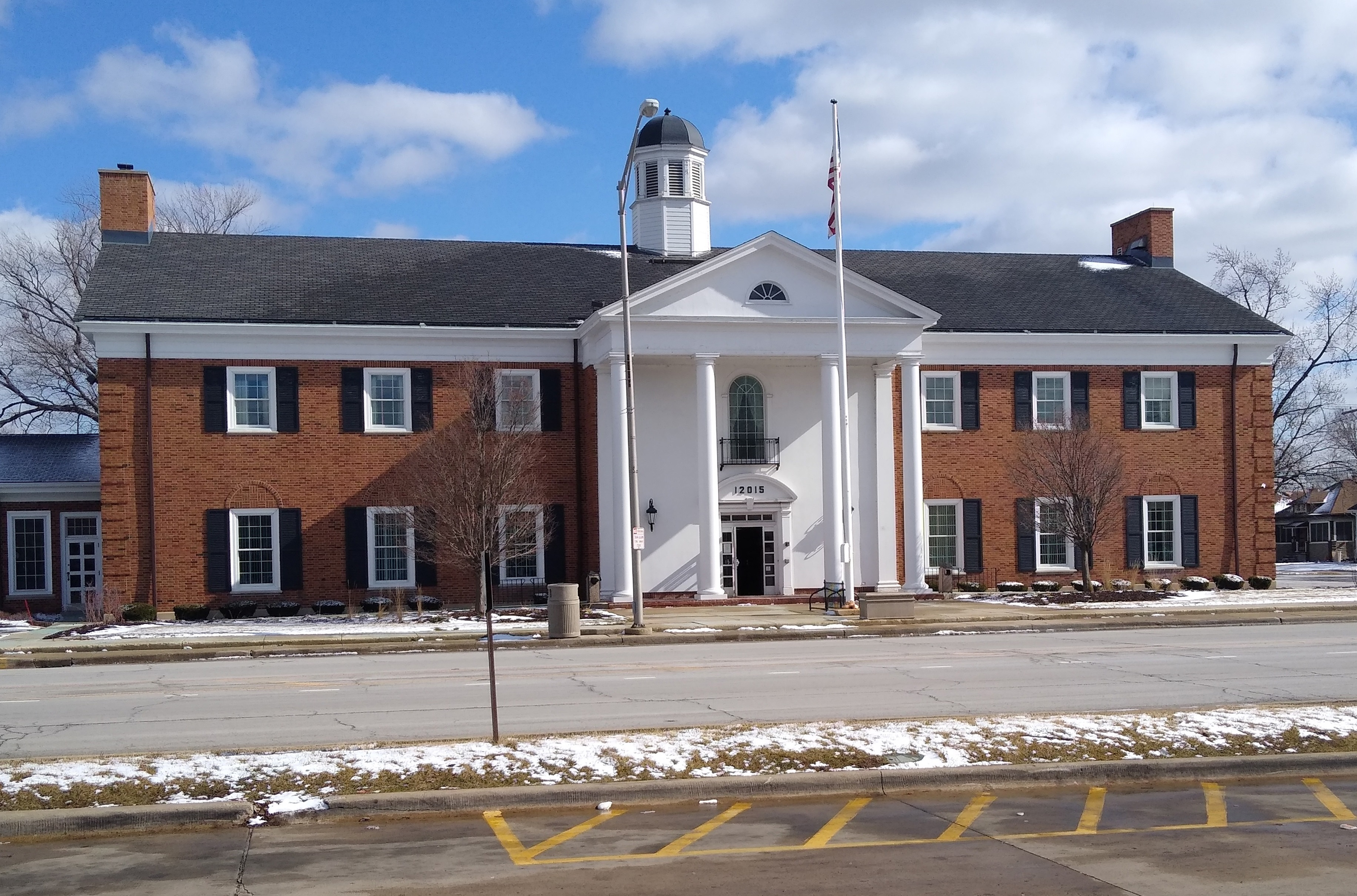
County Bank and Trust Co. building, Blue Island, IL
