= Wrigley Building =

Office skyscraper in Chicago, Illinois

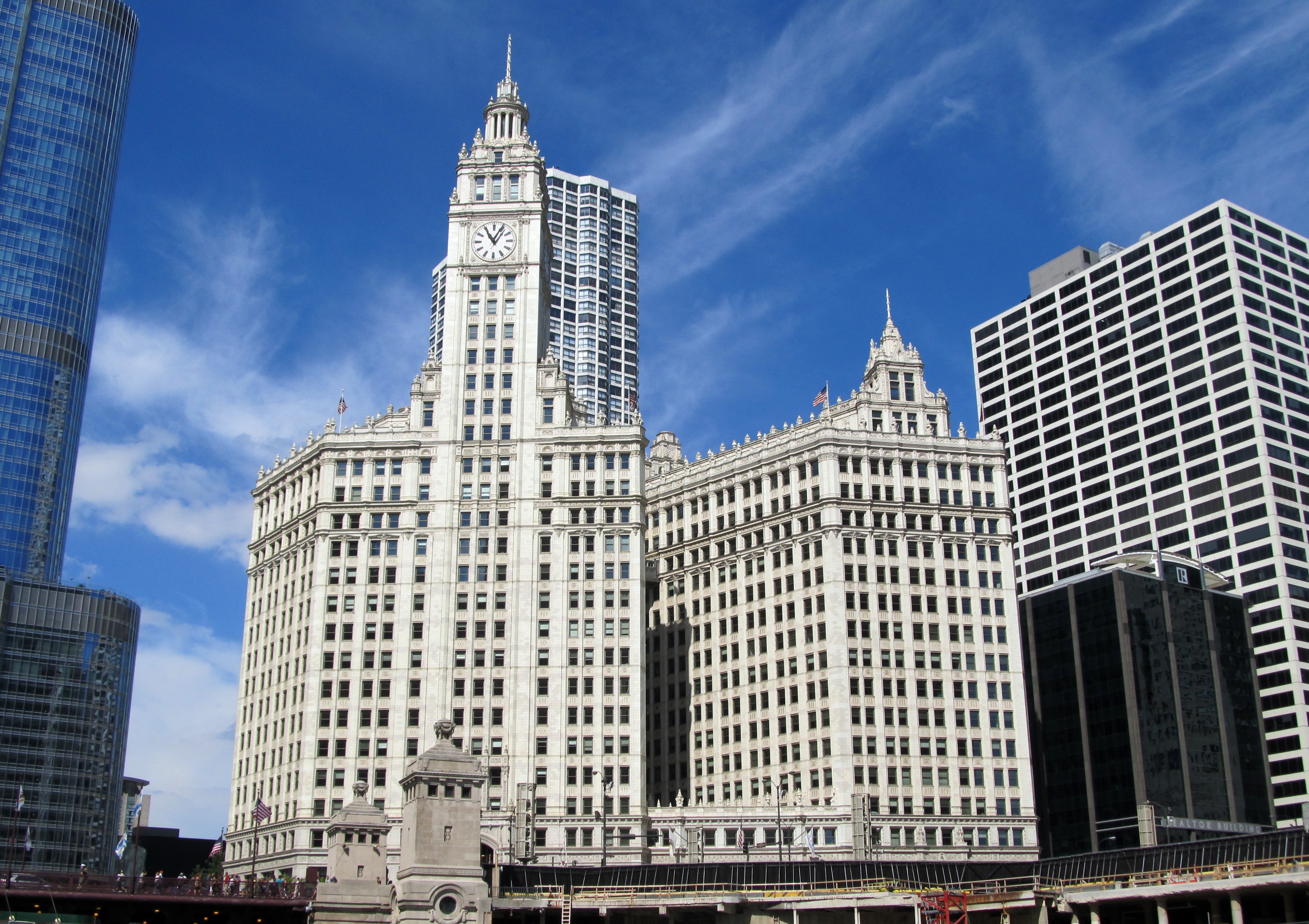
- Chicago's Wrigley Building
- Interactive map of the Wrigley Building area

General information
- Type: commercial offices
- Location: 400-410 N. Michigan Ave; Chicago, Illinois, United States
- Coordinates: 41.889707°N 87.624861°W
- Construction started: 1920
- Completed: September 1921
- Opening: May 1924 (both towers)

Height
- Antenna spire: 438 ft (134 m)
- Roof: 425 ft (130 m)
- Top floor: 21 (North Tower); 30 (South Tower)

Design and construction
- Architect: Graham, Anderson, Probst & White
- Developer: William Wrigley Jr.

The Wrigley Building is a commercial skyscraper located at 400–410 North Michigan Avenue on Chicago's Near North Side. It is located on the Magnificent Mile directly across Michigan Avenue from the Tribune Tower. Its two towers in an elaborate style were built between 1920 and 1924 to house the corporate headquarters of the Wrigley Company. Its bright white facade is covered in terra cotta.

== History ==
When ground was broken for the Wrigley Building in 1920, there were no major office buildings north of the Chicago River. The Michigan Avenue Bridge, which spans the river just south of the building, was still under construction. The land was selected by chewing gum magnate William Wrigley Jr. for the headquarters of his company. The building was designed by the architectural firm of Graham, Anderson, Probst & White using the shape of the Giralda tower of Seville's Cathedral combined with French Renaissance details. The 425-foot (130 m) south tower was completed in September 1921 and the north tower in May 1924. Walkways between the towers were added at the ground level and the third floor. In 1931, another walkway was added at the fourteenth floor to allow for a rearrangement of Wrigley's offices. The two towers, not including the levels below Michigan Avenue, have a combined area of 453,433 square feet (42,125.3 m^{2}).

The two towers are of differing heights, with the south tower rising to 30 stories and the north tower to 21 stories. On the south tower is a clock with faces pointing in all directions. Each face is 19 feet 7 inches (5.97 m) in diameter. The building is clad in glazed terra-cotta, which provides its gleaming white façade. On occasion, the entire building is hand washed to preserve the terra cotta. At night, the building is brightly lit with floodlights.

The Wrigley Building was Chicago's first air-conditioned office building. If one walks through the center doors, one will enter a secluded park area overlooking the Chicago River.

In the 1957 science fiction film Beginning of the End, giant grasshoppers attack downtown Chicago, and in one scene are shown climbing up the side of the Wrigley Building.

The Wrigley Building was sold in 2011 to a group of investors that includes Zeller Realty Group and Groupon co-founders Eric Lefkofsky and Brad Keywell. The new owners made the building more attractive to businesses by adding a Walgreens, a coffee shop, a fitness center and a nursing room for mothers.

In 2019, billionaire Joe Mansueto completed the purchase of the Wrigley Building.

== Tenants ==
Addresses at 400 North Michigan Avenue:

- The Consulate-General of Austria resides in Suite 707.
- The Consulate-General of the United Kingdom resided on the 12th and 13th floors of the Wrigley Building from 1996 to August 2011, when the Consulate-General relocated to another building on North Michigan Avenue.
- Select Model Management, located in Suite 700.

Addresses at 410 North Michigan Avenue:

- Chicagoland Chamber of Commerce, housed in Suite 900.
- EZCall, a division of Kronos Incorporated, housed in Suite 660.
- Capax Global US Headquarters, housed in Suite 650.
- Perkins and Will

== Gallery ==
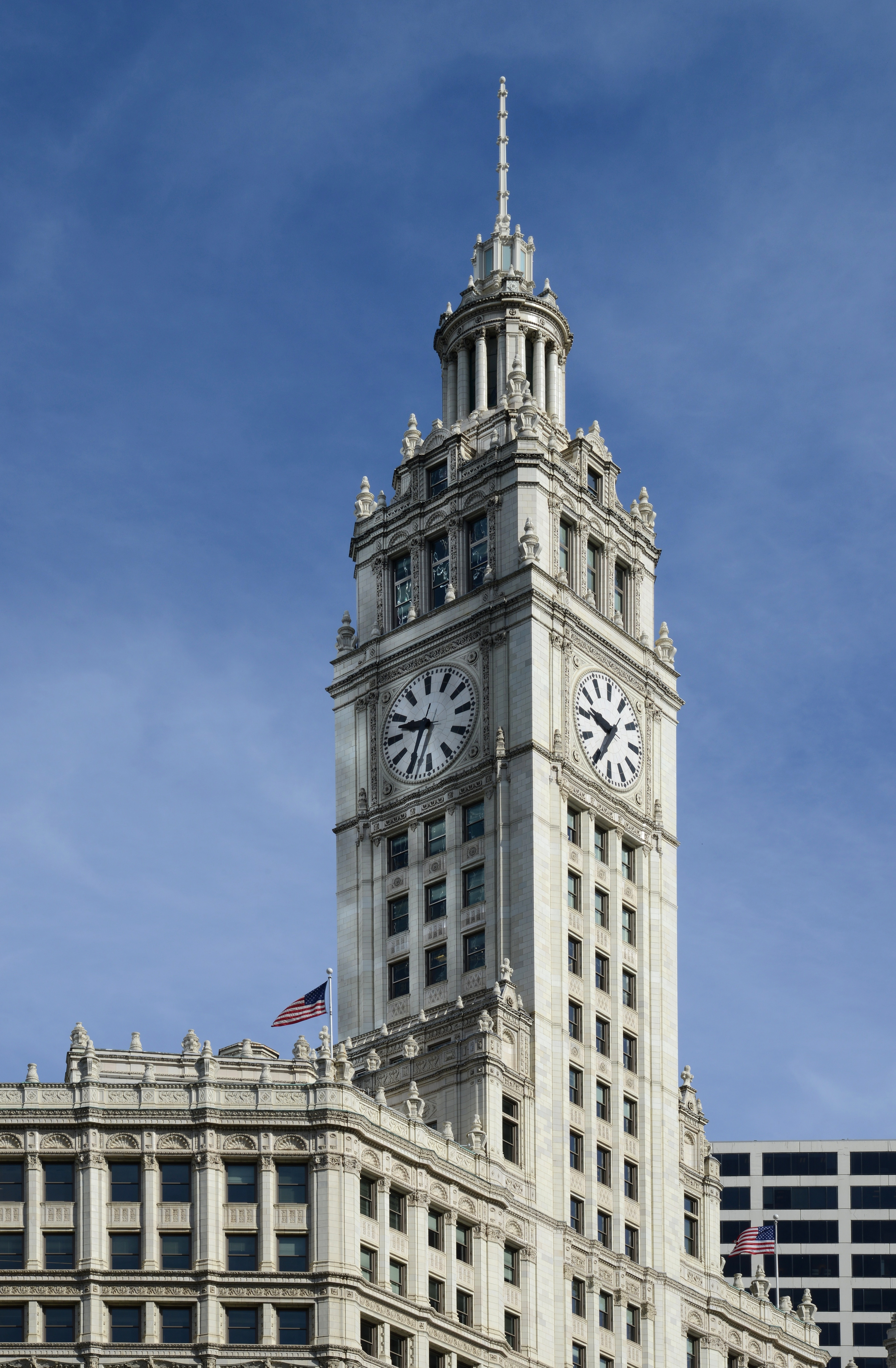
The Wrigley Building's Giralda-inspired tower

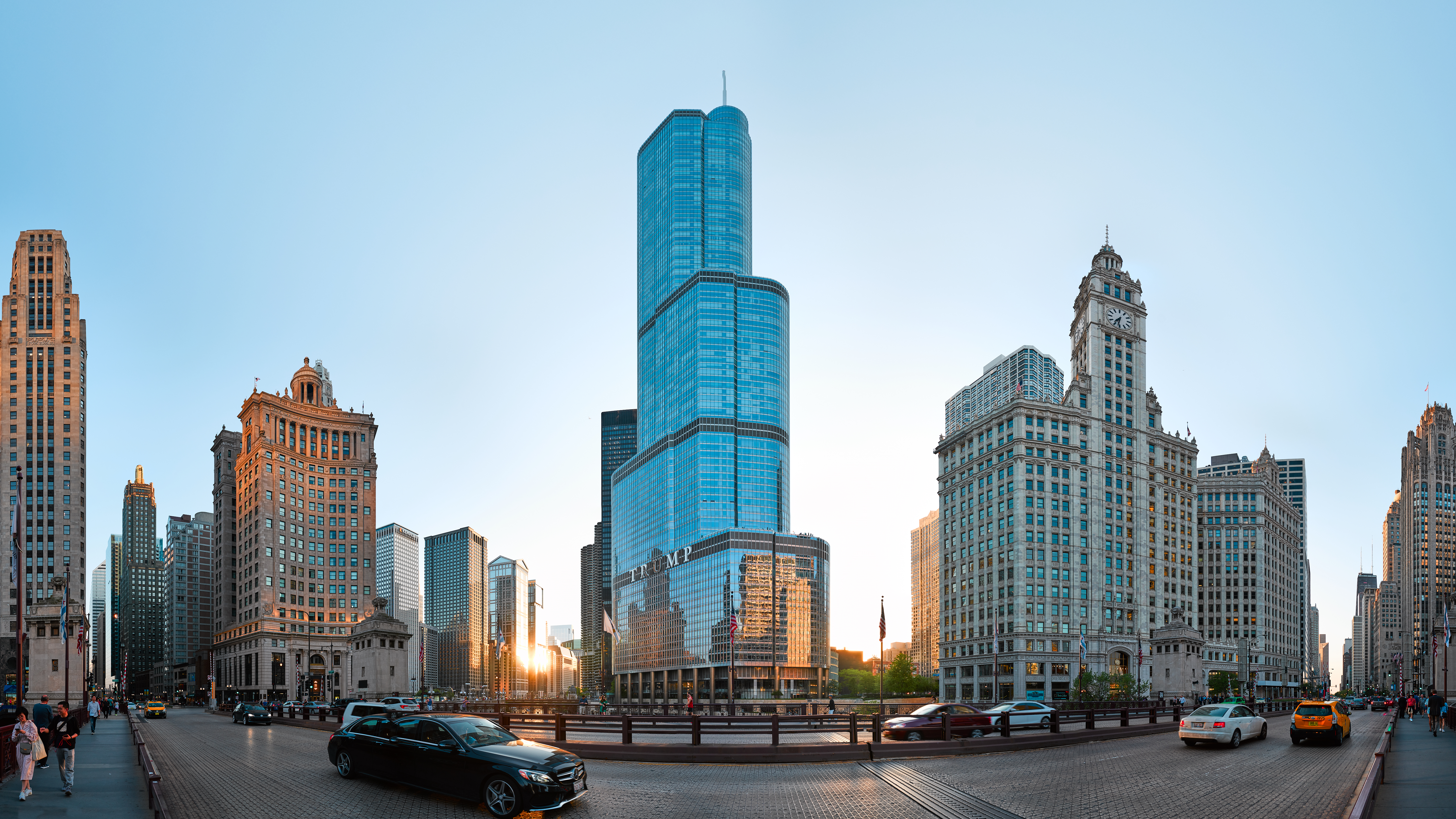
A view along Michigan Ave., the Wrigley Building is visible on the right

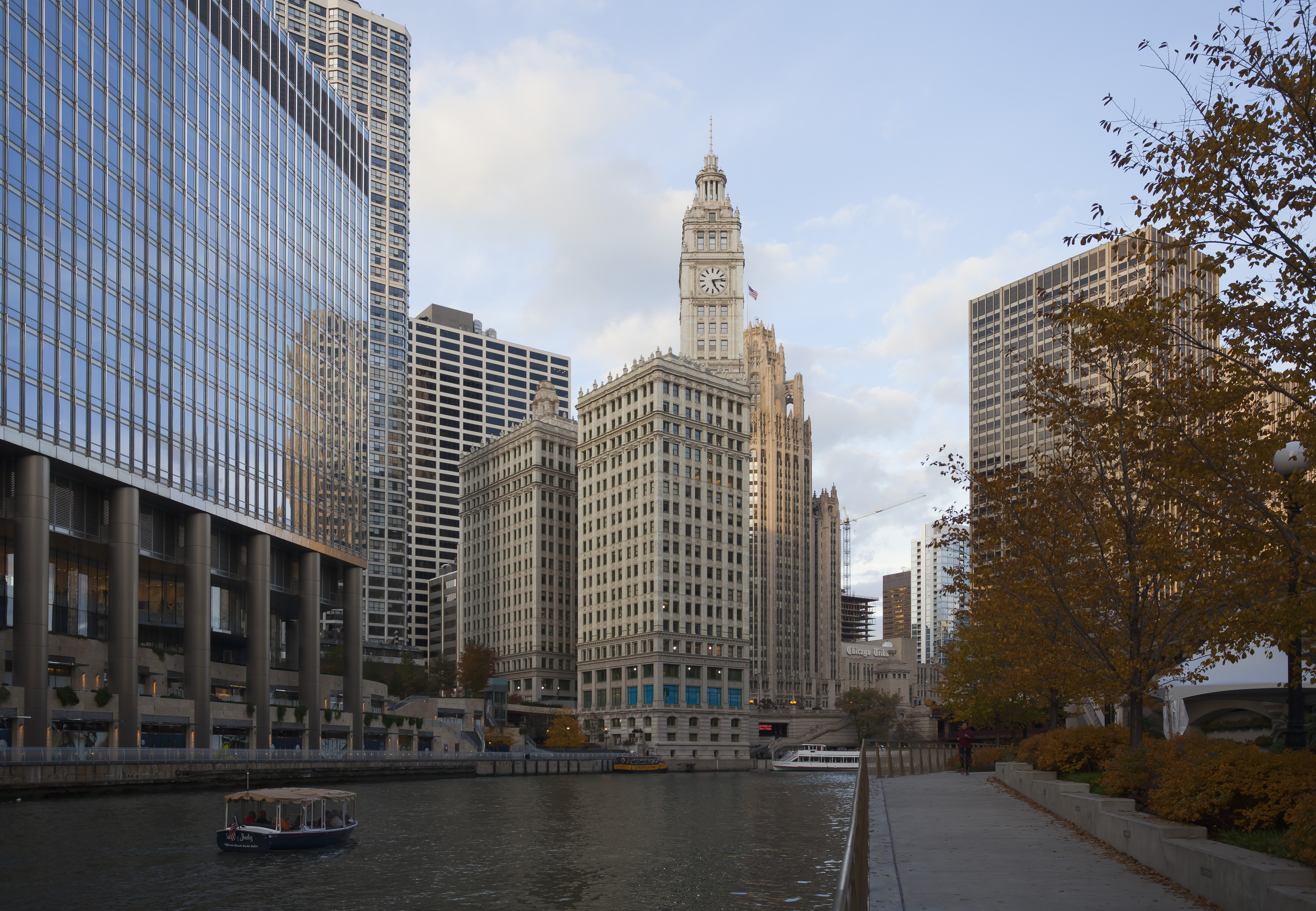
The structure from across the Chicago River

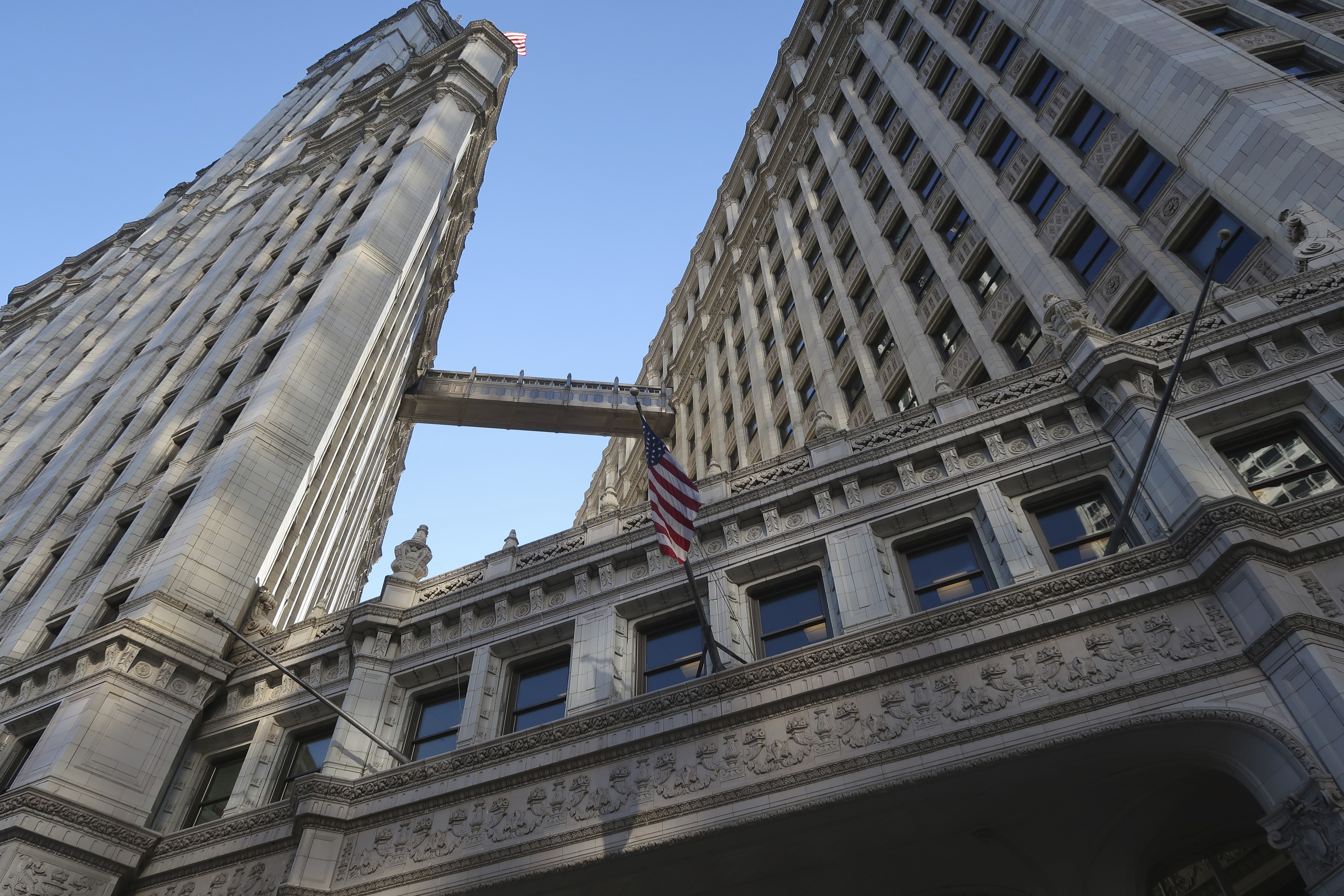
An upwards facing view of the building

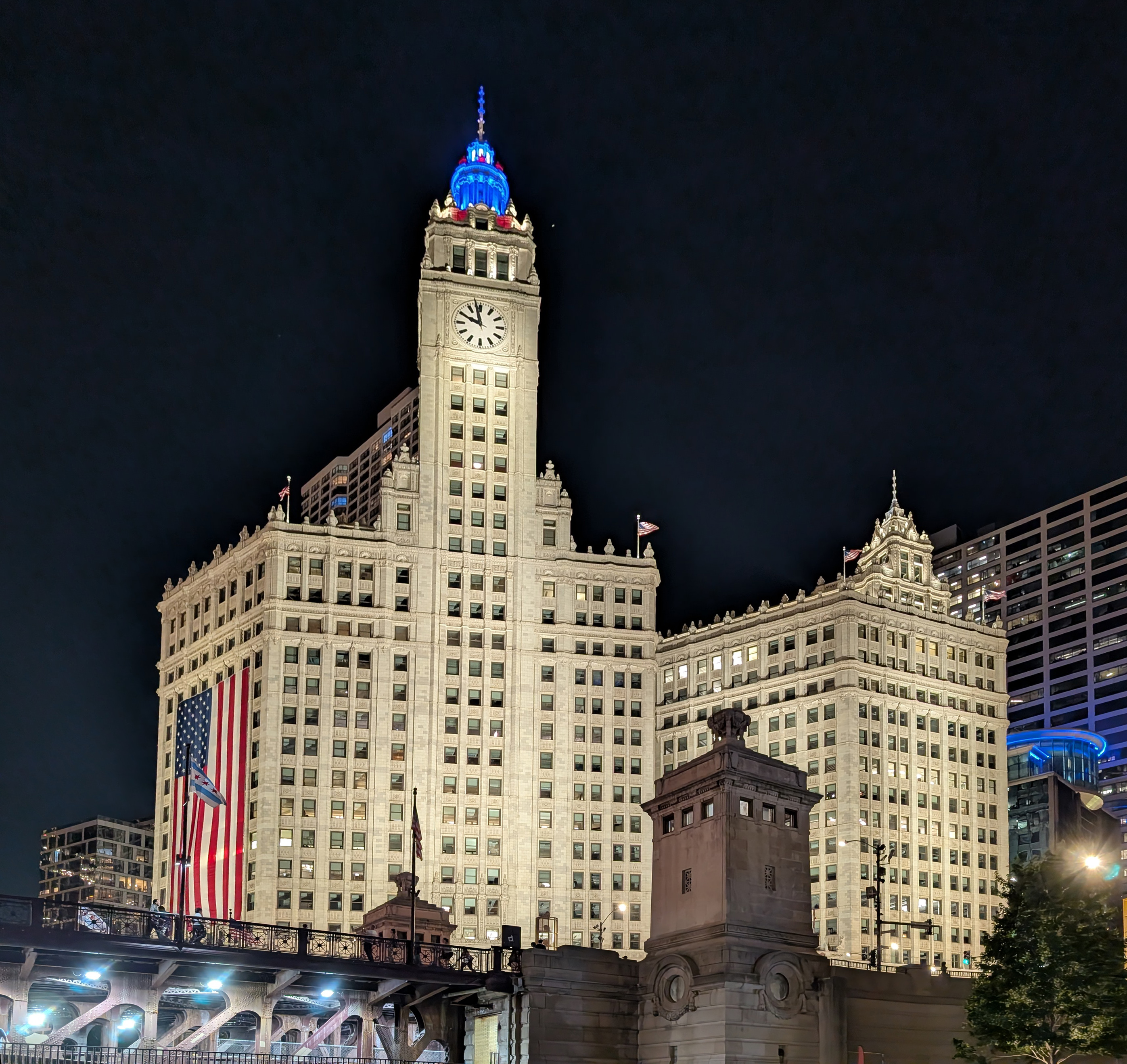
Night view of the Wrigley Building, from a boat on the Chicago River, with the northeast corner of the DuSable Bridge

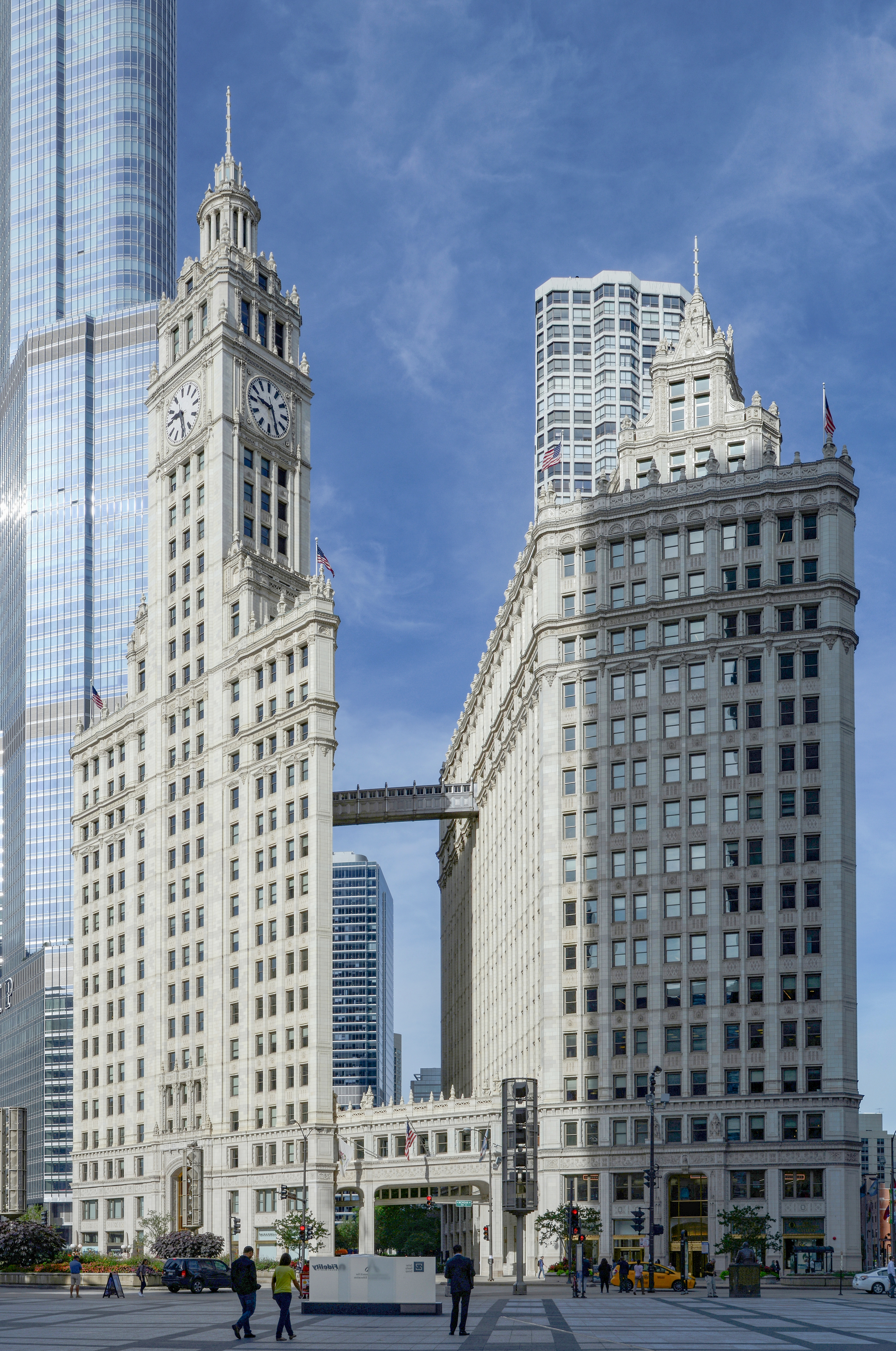
An angle of the building showing the annex in more detail

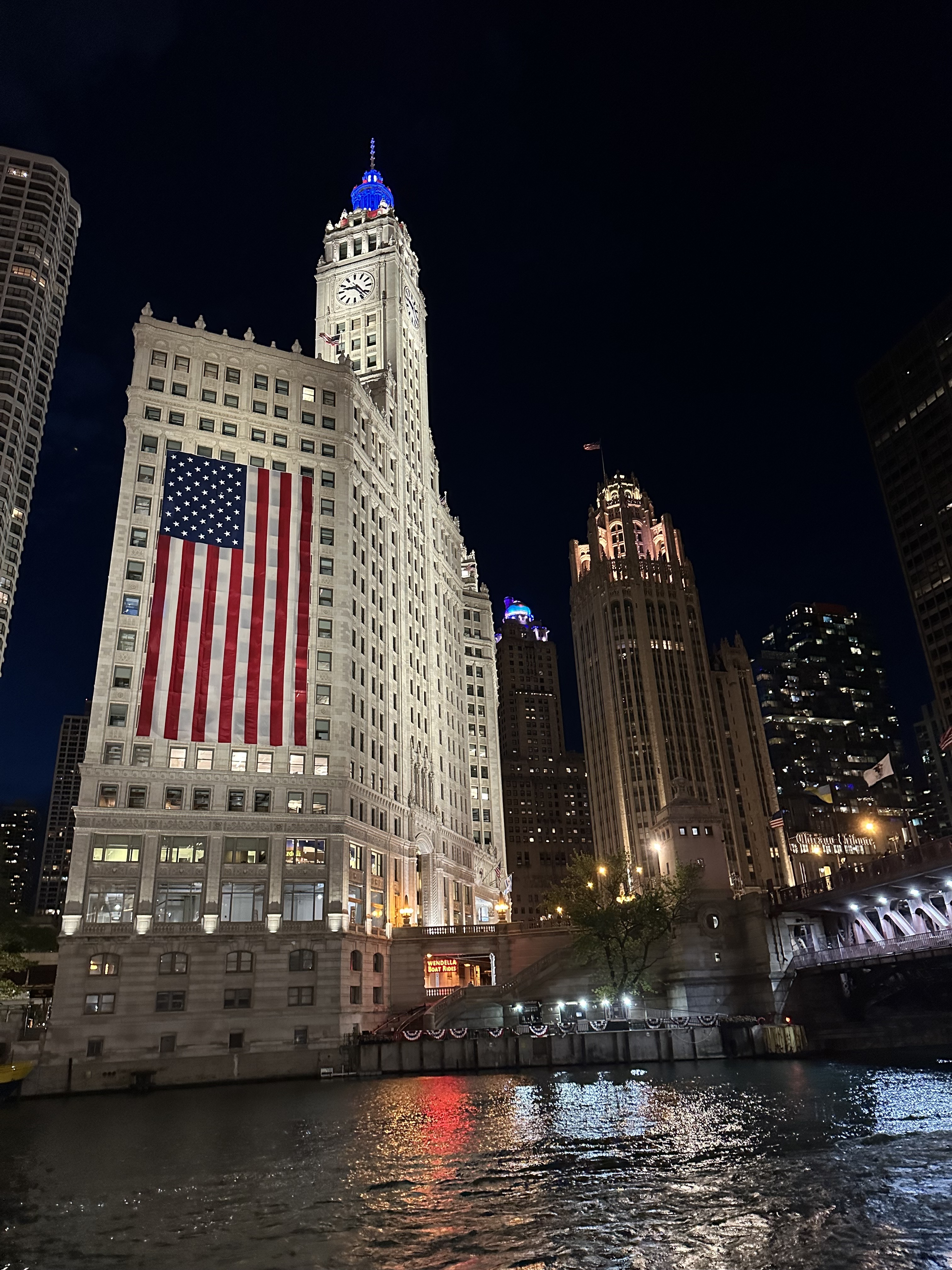
Wrigley Building lit up at night with the American flag from the Chicago River in July 2024

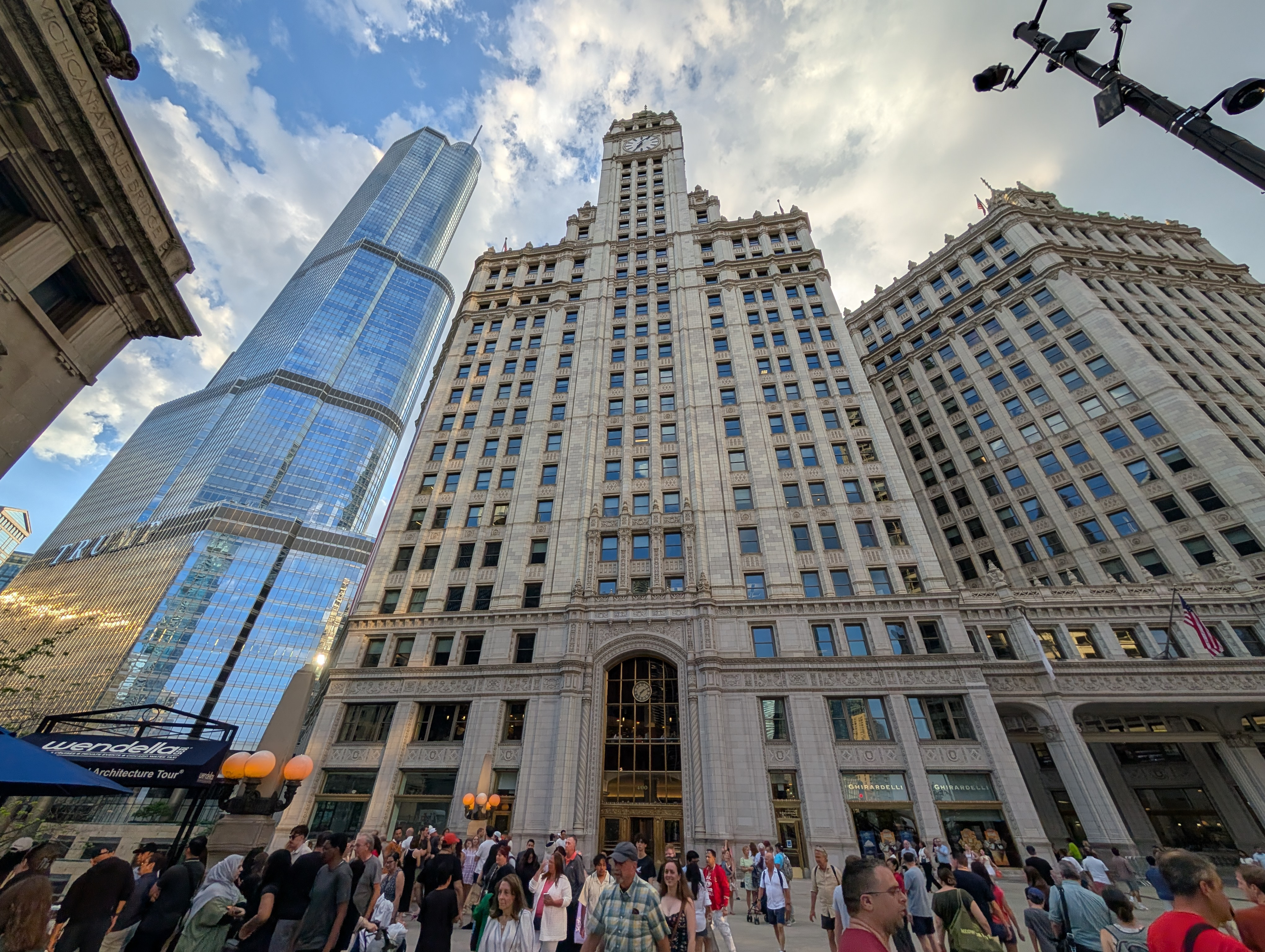
Wrigley Building with Trump Tower

== See also ==
- Architecture of Chicago
