= Terminal Tower =

Skyscraper in Cleveland, Ohio

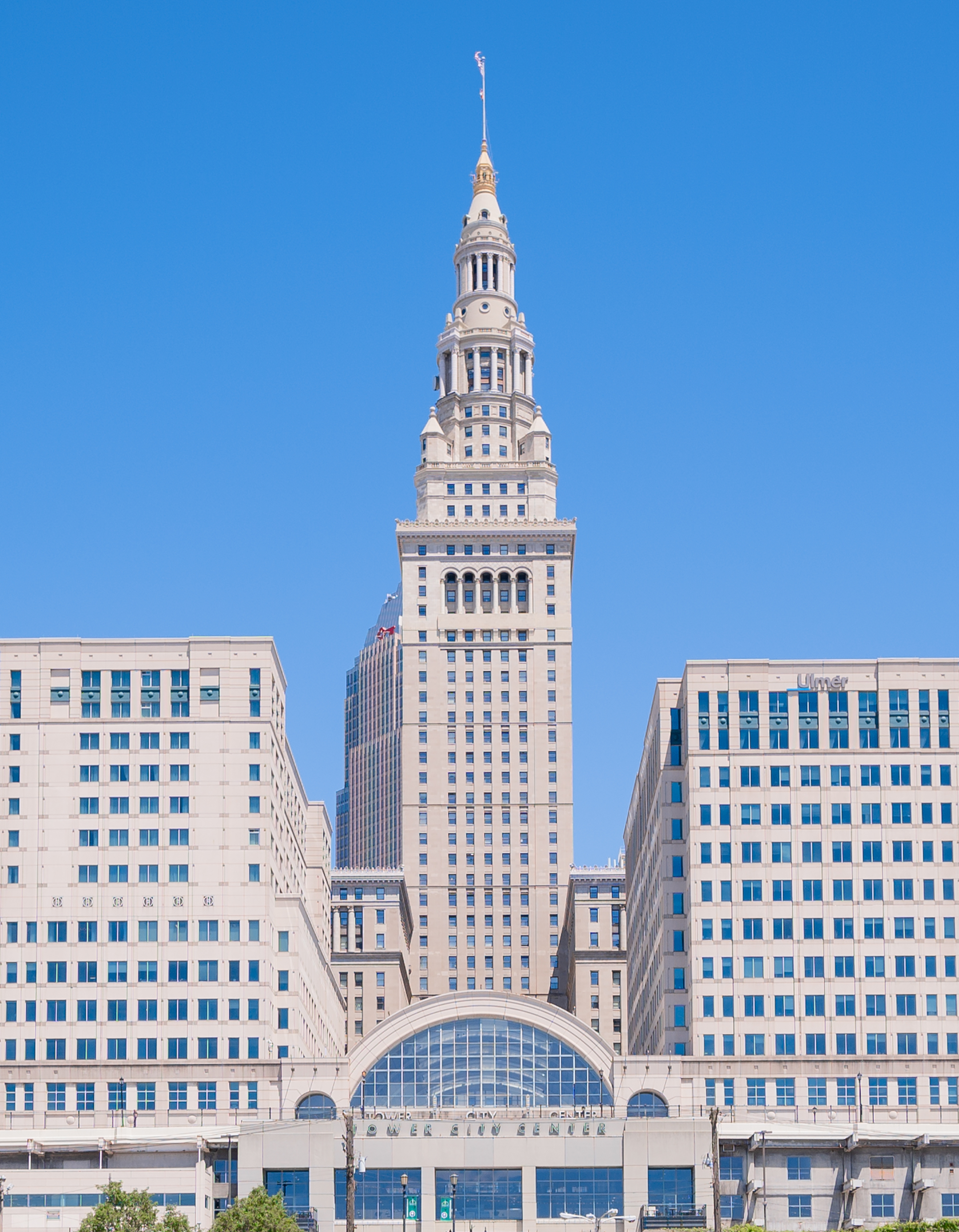
- View of Terminal Tower from the Cuyahoga River

General information
- Status: Completed
- Type: Commercial offices
- Location: 50 Public Square; Cleveland, Ohio, United States
- Coordinates: 41°29′54″N 81°41′38″W
- Construction started: July 1926
- Completed: August 18, 1927
- Opening: June 28, 1930
- Cost: $179 million
- Owner: K&D Management, LLC

Height
- Antenna spire: 771 ft (235 m)
- Roof: 708 ft (216 m)
- Top floor: 52

Technical details
- Floor area: 577,000 sq ft (53,600 m^{2})

Design and construction
- Architect: Graham, Anderson, Probst & White
- Developer: Van Sweringen brothers
- Structural engineer: Henry Jouett

Other information
- Public transit: Tower City

Website
- www.terminaltower.com

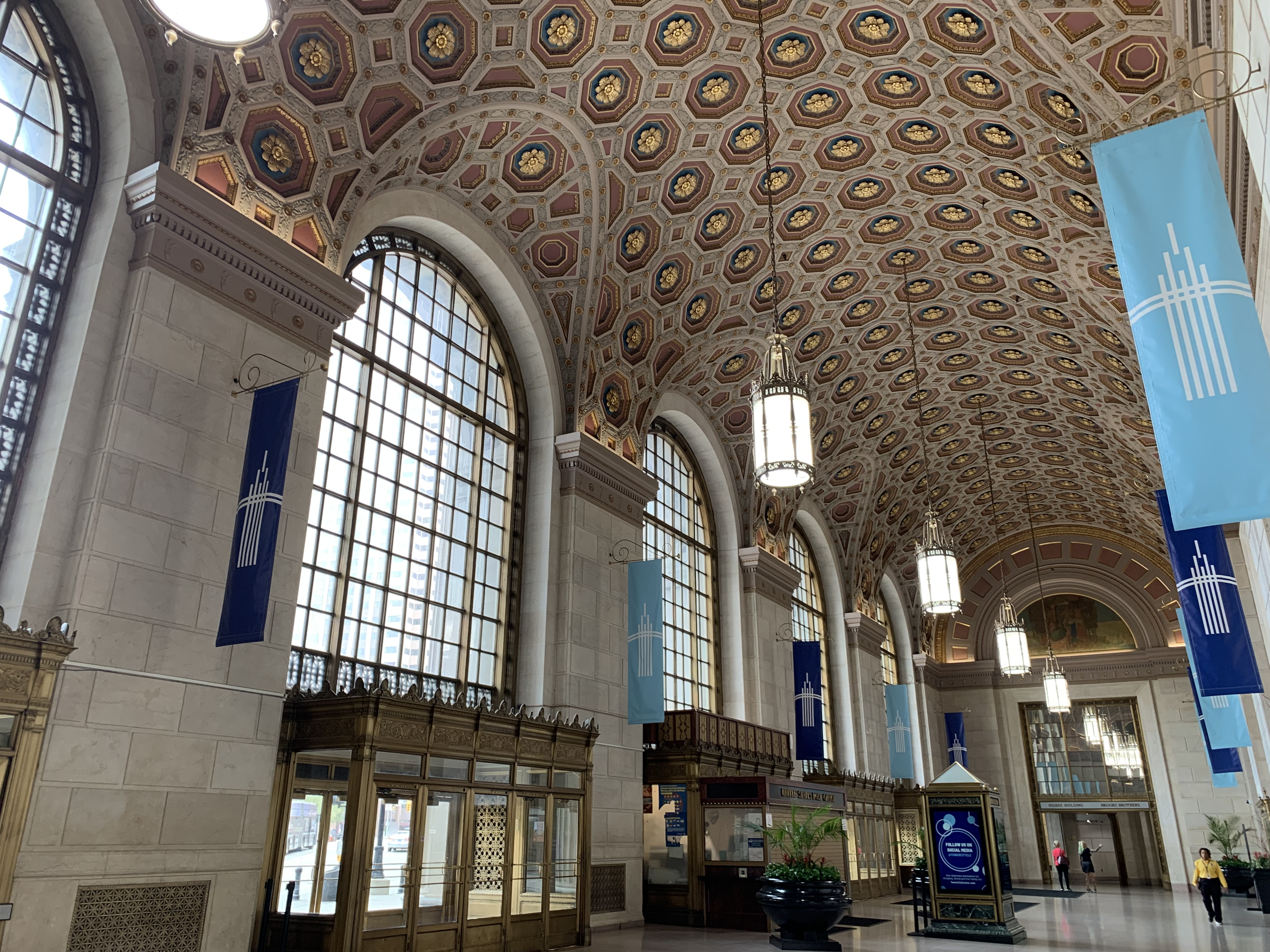
Terminal Tower lobby

Terminal Tower is a 52-story, 708 ft (216 m), landmark skyscraper located on Public Square in the downtown core of Cleveland, Ohio, United States. Built during the skyscraper boom of the 1920s and 1930s, it was the second-tallest building in the world when it was completed in 1927. Terminal Tower stood as the tallest building in North America outside of New York City from its completion until 1964. It was the tallest building in the state of Ohio until the completion of Key Tower in 1991, and remains the second-tallest building in the state. The building is part of the Tower City Center mixed-use development, and its major tenants include Forest City Enterprises, which maintained its corporate headquarters there until 2018, and Riverside Company.

== Ownership ==
The tower, owned by Forest City Realty Trust since 1983, was purchased by Cleveland's K&D Group on September 15, 2016, for $38.5 million (equivalent to $49.2 million in 2024). K&D added a mixed-use element to the building, converting 11 of the lower, larger floors to residential use, with 293 one- and two-bedroom apartments. Many other historic downtown buildings are undergoing similar conversions. K&D is the largest privately held owner/manager of apartment buildings in the area and maintains the tower's upper floors as office spaces.

== Architecture ==
Built for $179 million by the Van Sweringen brothers, the tower was to serve as an office building atop the city's new rail station, the Cleveland Union Terminal. Originally planned to be 14 stories, the structure was expanded to 52 floors with a height of 708 feet (216 m). It rests on 280-foot (85 m) caissons. Designed by the firm of Graham, Anderson, Probst & White, the tower was modeled after the Beaux-Arts New York Municipal Building by McKim, Mead, and White. The Terminal Tower was completed in 1927 and opened for tenants in 1928, though the Union Terminal complex was not dedicated until 1930.

It remained the tallest building in the world outside of New York City until the completion of the main building of Moscow State University in Moscow in 1953; it was the tallest building in North America outside of New York until the Prudential Center in Boston was completed in 1964.

In the late 1960s through 1980s, radio station WCLV maintained studios on the 15th floor. The transmitter was on the 43rd floor with transmission line running up the outside of the building to the antenna assembly attached to the flagpole atop the building. In the tiny cupola, which is technically the 52nd floor, there was equipment for the antenna heaters and a small telephone.

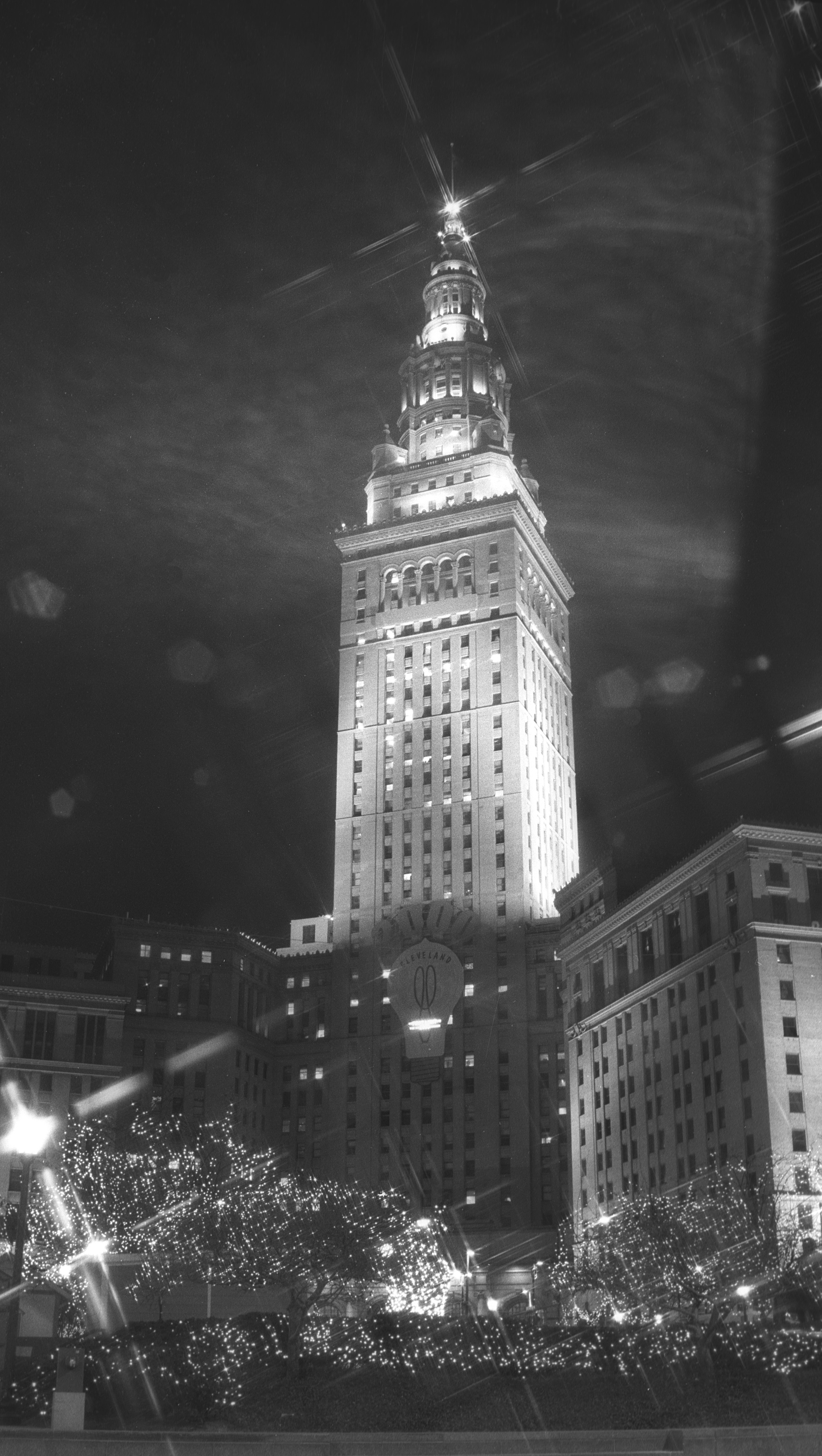
Cleveland's Terminal Tower in Public Square at night

At one time, many two-way radio and microwave radio systems were also located on the floors above the observation deck.

In the 1980s, developers sought approval to make their proposed BP Building taller than the Terminal Tower, but city officials forced them to scale it down. The Terminal Tower remained the tallest building in Ohio until the 1991 completion of Society Center, now Key Tower.

=== Observation deck ===
On a clear day, visitors on the observation deck can see 30 miles (48 km) from downtown Cleveland.

In 1976 there was a incident involving a man with a gun, where a man held 13 people hostage in the Chessie System's Terminal Tower offices.

After the September 11, 2001 attacks, the observation deck was again closed to the public. In 2007, a proposal was brought to Forest City to reopen the deck. The proposal included a renovation of the deck and the addition of an express elevator to take visitors to it. This was to be done after the upper floors were renovated and the scaffolding removed. In 2010, Forest City Enterprises finished renovating the complex's elevators, upper floors, and spire. The observation deck reopened on July 10, 2010 for a limited period, with plans to expand public access.

To reach the observation deck, visitors take the elevator to the 32nd floor and then transfer to another elevator to reach the 42nd floor. Before its original closure, the deck was open only on weekends to prevent disruption to the law firm that has offices on the 32nd floor.

In 2018, the Observation Deck was open on weekends from noon to 4 pm, with reservations. It had been renovated to its look in the 1930s. in 2024, the Observation Deck is open on weekends in the afternoon, closed in winter except for the holidays, and tickets are reserved online.

== External lighting ==
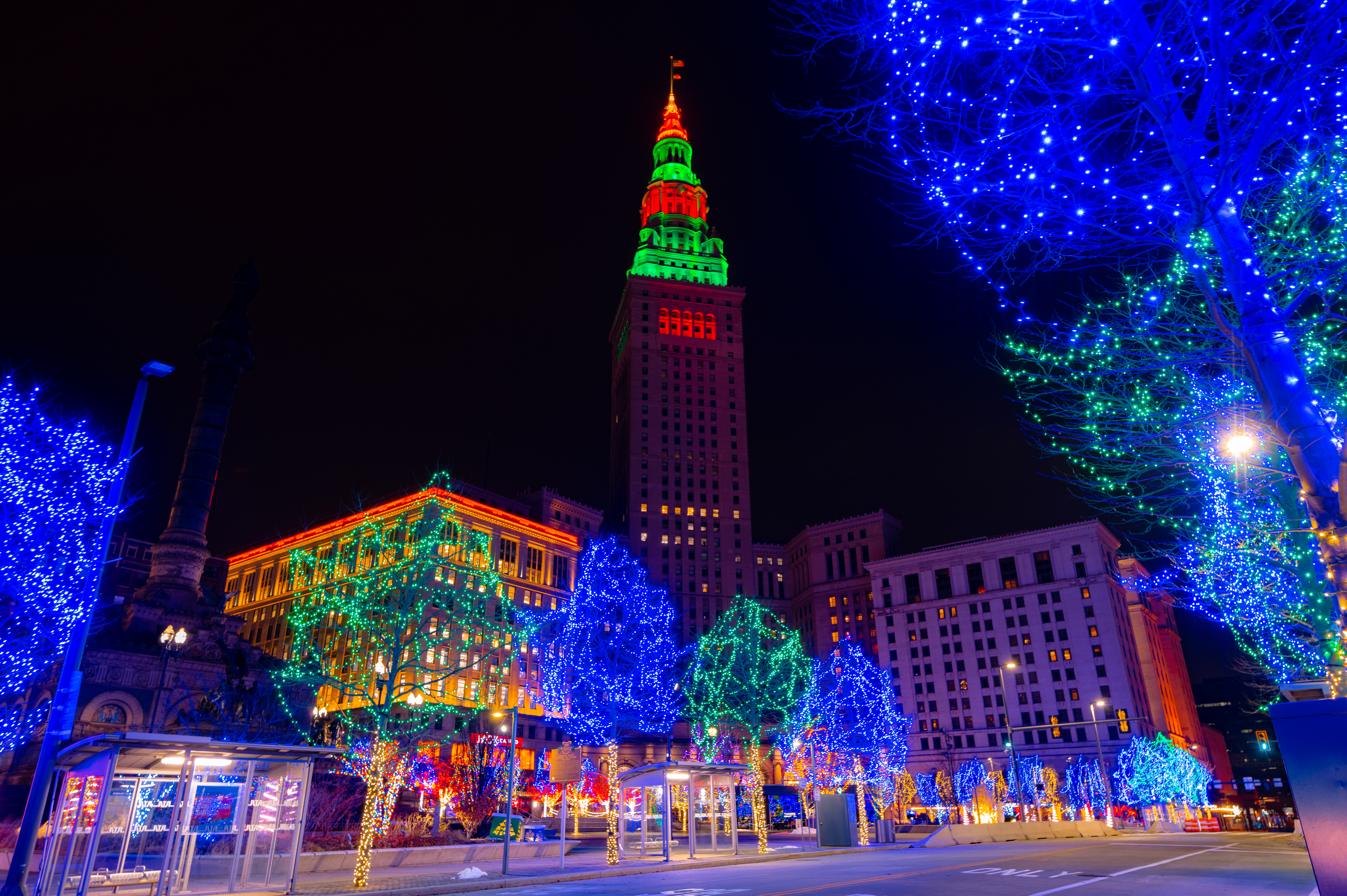
Terminal Tower lit up in holiday colors for Winterfest Cleveland 2020

The Terminal Tower was lit when dedicated in 1930. A strobe light on top of the tower rotated 360 degrees. It helped ships in Cleveland's port and airplane pilots landing at Cleveland Hopkins International Airport.

The external spotlights that lit the tower at night were turned off as a safety measure at the beginning of World War II. They were not turned on again until September 22, 1974. They were relit on the same day that the annual Greater Cleveland United Torch Drive (a precursor to the United Way) began. Lights were installed on the 44th, 48th, and 52nd floors. In the 1960s, the strobe was retired and replaced with conventional aircraft warning lights. The tower only once went dark, during the 2003 blackout.

Today, the tower's external lights include 508 LEDs that can be configured into various color schemes, such as red and green during the Christmas season and red, white, and blue for various federal holidays.

Many Cleveland social and medical groups light Terminal Tower for their causes. In February, Terminal Tower is red for the American Heart Association Go Red for Women campaign, and pink for Breast Cancer Awareness month in October. Some of Cleveland's ethnic groups have had the Terminal Tower lit in their traditional colors, such as green on Saint Patrick's Day. On Polish Constitution Day, usually May 3, Cleveland's Pol-Am community lights the tower in white and red (Polish flag colors), and the tower goes red, green, and white (Italian flag colors) for Columbus Day.

Terminal Tower also sports the colors of the various sports teams in town, such as red, white, and blue for the Cleveland Guardians, orange and brown for the Cleveland Browns, and wine and gold for the Cleveland Cavaliers. During the 2014 Gay Games, the tower was lit in a rainbow pattern (representing the gay pride flag). In January 2015, Terminal Tower was lit in scarlet and gray in support of the Ohio State Buckeyes during the football team's National Championship run as Cleveland has a large OSU fan and alumni base.

Terminal Tower was lit in teal blue on Friday, May 15, in honor of the Class of 2020 Cuyahoga Community College graduates. The Tower was lit with blue and yellow in support of Ukraine during the 2022 Russian invasion of Ukraine.

== In popular culture ==
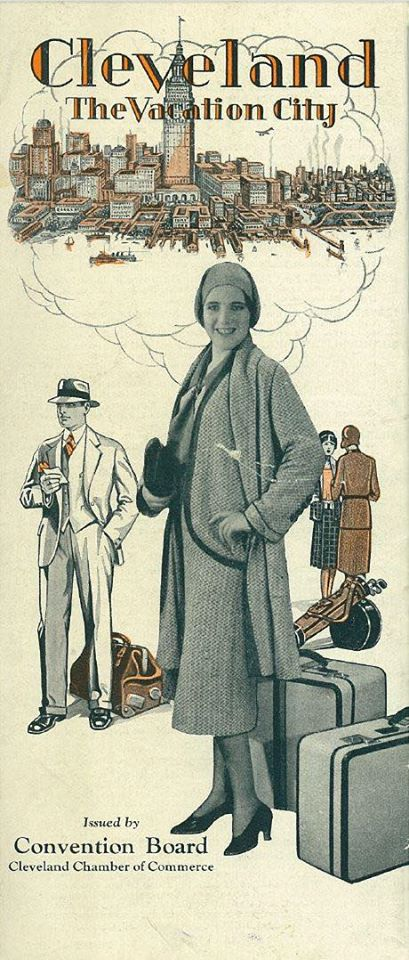
Cleveland travel brochure from 1930, featuring the newly dedicated Terminal Tower

- Held annually since 2003, Terminal Tower hosted a "Tackle the Tower" stair-climb charity race from the Tower City mall concourse to the observation deck.
- The tower appeared in the climactic scene of the 2001 movie Proximity, starring Rob Lowe. Lowe's character led his pursuers from the RTA rapid station to the shopping concourse.
- The tower is featured in the films The Fortune Cookie (1966), The Deer Hunter (1978), A Christmas Story (1983), and Major League (1989).
- Cleveland-based art-punk band Pere Ubu titled their 1985 compilation of early singles and B-sides Terminal Tower.
- The tower can be seen in some scenes from Spider-Man 3 (2007), The Avengers (2012) and Superman (2025), parts of which were filmed in Cleveland. It is also seen in parts of Welcome to Collinwood (2002) and The Oh in Ohio (2006).
- On August 20, 1938, as part of a publicity stunt by the Come to Cleveland Committee, Cleveland Indians players Hank Helf and Frankie Pytlak successfully caught baseballs dropped from the tower by the Indians' third baseman Ken Keltner. The 708-foot (216 m) drop broke the 555-foot, 30-year-old record set by Washington Senators catcher Gabby Street at the Washington Monument. The baseballs were estimated to have been traveling at 138 miles (222 km) per hour when caught.
- Terminal Tower is featured in the opening credits of Hot in Cleveland.
- Graphic artist Harvey Pekar, writer of American Splendor, regularly featured the tower in his comics.
- Terminal Tower is displayed and mentioned among other Cleveland attractions on a season 1 episode of 30 Rock, titled "Cleveland," during a musical montage of the city.
- The tower is featured in cartoon form on the logo of the now defunct Yellow Cab Company's "I Like Cleveland" logo on the fleet of vehicles.
- Terminal Tower was famously photographed by noted photo journalist Margaret Bourke-White.
- Terminal Tower is regularly presented on the cover of the Cleveland Magazine, in fact the last section of each issue which recalls past triumphs, tragedies and tales about the city of Cleveland, is entitled Terminal Tower.
- The Terminal Tower features heavily in the 2017 detective noire thriller book called The Noir Evil which retells the events of the Cleveland Torso Murderer investigation with elements of Lovecraftian horror

== See also ==
- List of tallest buildings in Cleveland
- List of tallest buildings in the United States

Preceded by Chicago Temple Building	Tallest building in the United States outside of New York City; 1927–1964; 216 m	Succeeded by Prudential Tower
