= Pittsfield Building =

Office skyscraper in Chicago, Illinois

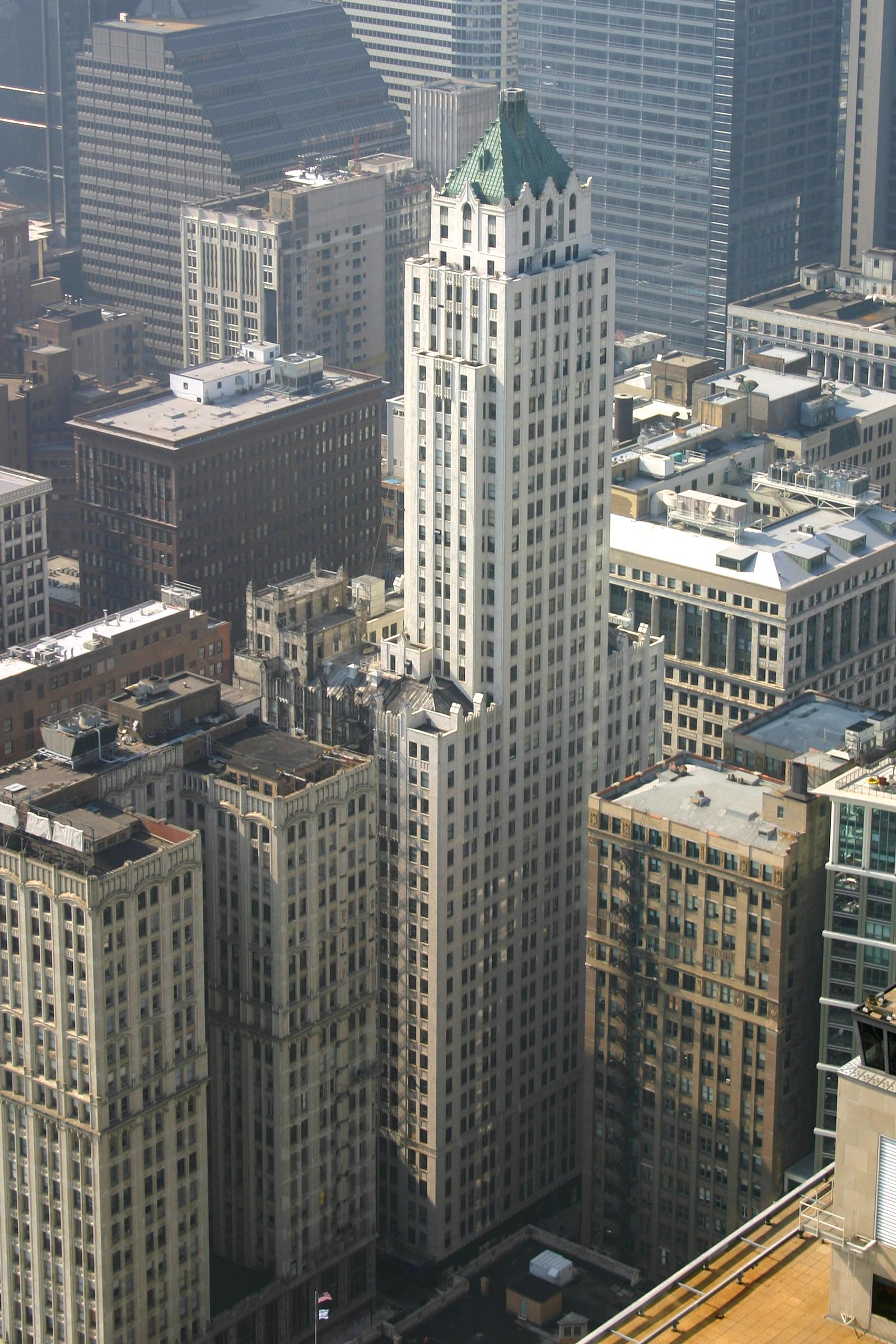
- The Pittsfield Building as seen from the northeast
- Interactive map of the Pittsfield Building area

General information
- Type: Office
- Location: 55 E. Washington St. Chicago, Illinois
- Coordinates: 41.8830°N 87.6257°W
- Completed: 1927

Height
- Roof: 551 ft (168 m)

Technical details
- Floor count: 38

Design and construction
- Architect: Graham, Anderson, Probst & White

Chicago Landmark
- Designated: November 6, 2002

The Pittsfield Building is a 38-story skyscraper located at 55 E. Washington Street in the Loop community area of Chicago, Illinois, United States, that was the city's second tallest building at the time of its completion, being surpassed only by the Chicago temple building. The building was designated as a Chicago Landmark on November 6, 2002.

== History ==
The property was developed by heirs of Marshall Field, and is named after Pittsfield, Massachusetts, where Marshall Field obtained his first job. While it is located in the Jewelers' Row Landmark District, the original design and occupancy was for medical & dental professionals, including offices, laboratories, and medical supplies. The nearby Burnham Center, at the intersection of Clark Street and Washington Street, was originally named the Conway Building after Conway, Massachusetts—the birthplace of Marshall Field. Marshall Field III presented the property as a gift to the Field Museum of Natural History in honor of the museum's 50th anniversary in 1944. The museum held the property until September 1960 when the museum sold it.

In 2000, Florida-based Morgan Reed Group acquired the entire building for $15 million. During that period, the building was used mostly by doctors, dentists and jewelers. In 2008, the Skokie, Illinois-based Alter Group bought floors 13 through 21 and converted it into a student dormitory known as Fornelli Tower, which was attached to Roosevelt University and Robert Morris University. Morgan Reed retained ownership of the remaining 30 stories and began exploring redevelopment options around the same time. In 2012, Morgan Reed placed the lower floors for sale.

=== Redevelopment plans ===
The Chicago government gave Chicago Hotel Partners the right to construct a hotel in the building in June 2015. Morgan Reed and Alter separately agreed to sell their respective sections of the building to Adam David Lynd, who wanted to develop a hotel there, but the deals fell through. Lynd sued both Morgan Reed, for misrepresenting whether the building could be converted to hotel use, and Alter, for misrepresenting the size of its ownership stake. The next year, the Chicago City Council rezoned the site to prevent it from being used as a hotel; subsequently, Chicago Hotel Partners sued its own law firm, which had advocated for the rezoning. In April 2017, Akara Partners offered to pay $16 million for Morgan Reed's section of the building, allowing these floors to potentially be converted to apartments. The next month, New York-based firm Pioneer Acquisitions bid $16.5 million for the building.

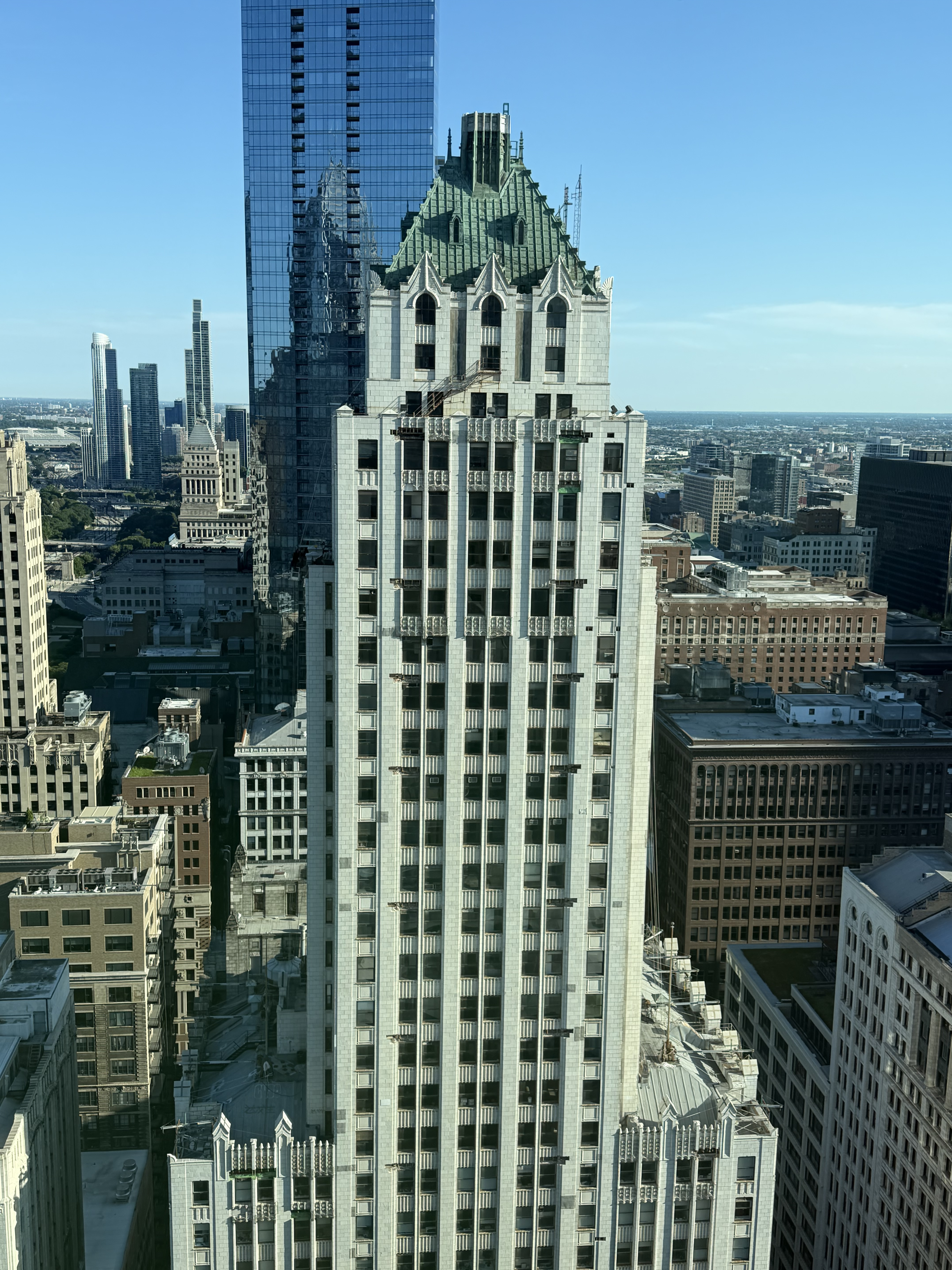
A view of the Pittsfield building seen from the north

Morgan Reed filed for Chapter 11 bankruptcy in 2017 and alleged in a lawsuit that the city of Chicago had illegally downzoned the property. A Toronto businessman, Xiao Hua "Edward" Gong, acquired Morgan Reed's portion in a bankruptcy auction, paying $20.8 million that June. Gong's assets were frozen later that year due to criminal securities fraud charges in Canada, and a restraining order was placed on the building to prevent it from being redeveloped. A 2019 lawsuit by Marc Realty, which controlled floors 13–21, alleged that an investor called Andiamo One had subleased rooms to Pangea, which had illegally rented them out as hotel rooms. In the meantime, the Pittsfield Building began to decay, and scaffolding was placed around the building in 2020 after pieces of the facade began to fall off. The restraining order was lifted in February 2021; the building was in receivership at the time, and its receiver Courtney Jones sued Gong to recover unpaid bills of $5 million. Gong attempted to block a foreclosure sale in 2023 but ultimately dropped the case.

The investor Tom Liravongsa of Grand Rapids, Michigan, acquired Gong's 30-story ownership stake in April 2023. In 2025, Liravongsa announced plans to convert his portion of the building into 214 residences, documenting his renovations on TikTok. At the time, Marc Realty had already converted floors 13–21 into 177 apartments. Morgan Reed sued the city the same year, claiming that the city council's decision to ban hotel uses from the Pittsfield Building was a violation of the Fifth Amendment to the United States Constitution and that the building's value had decreased significantly as a result. Morgan Reed's attorneys alleged that several potential buyers had withdrawn their bids for the building after it was rezoned, but city officials claimed that the ban on hotel uses did not preclude the building from being redeveloped for some other purpose. In September 2025, the Chicago City Council approved plans to convert part of the building into 214 apartments and add a rooftop cafe.

== Architecture ==
Designed by Graham, Anderson, Probst and White, the structure combines both art deco and Gothic detailing, while complying with a 1923 zoning ordinance which mandated skyscrapers setbacks. The interior of the building features a five-story atrium, lined by balconies and shops, that is detailed with glowing marbles, gleaming brass and Spanish Gothic style carvings.

=== Gallery ===
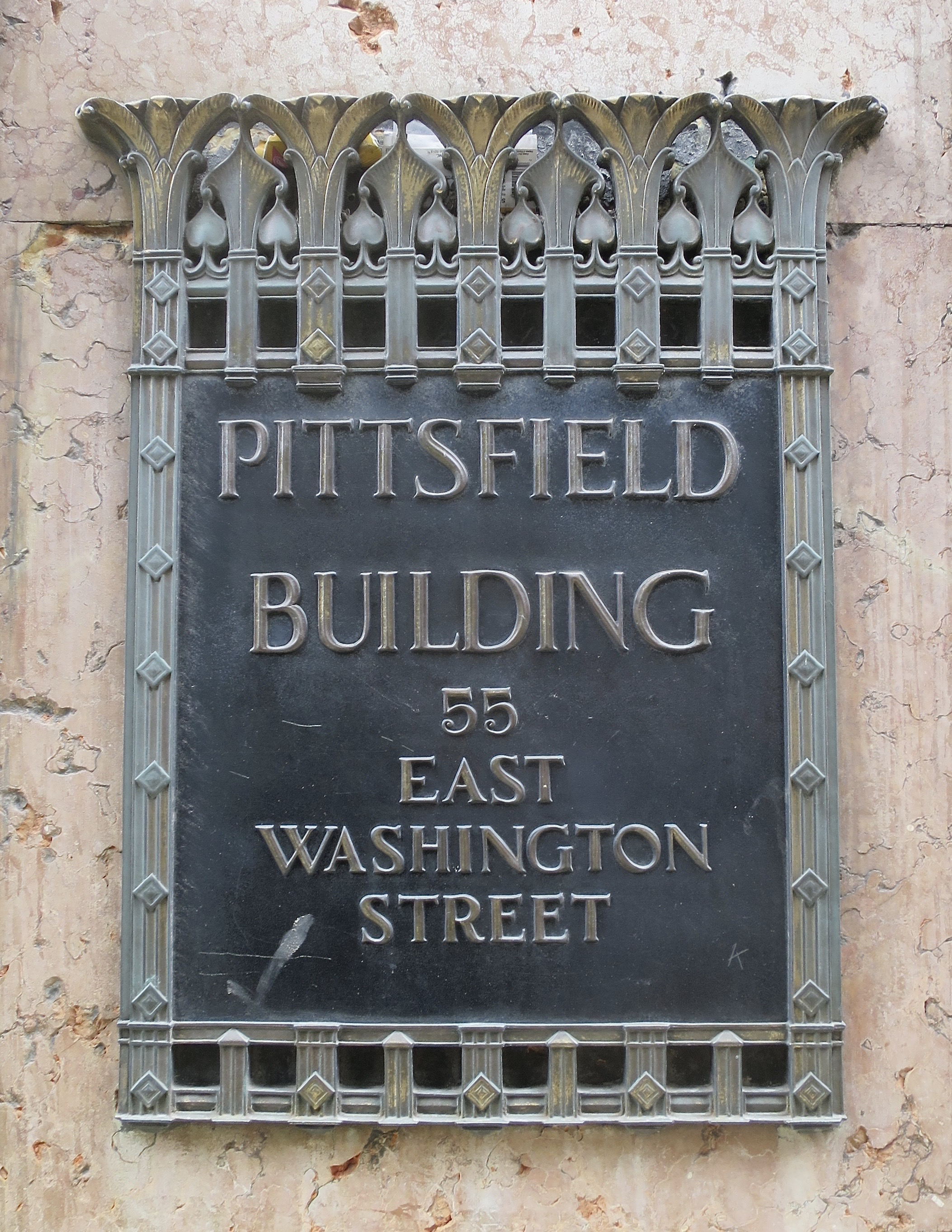

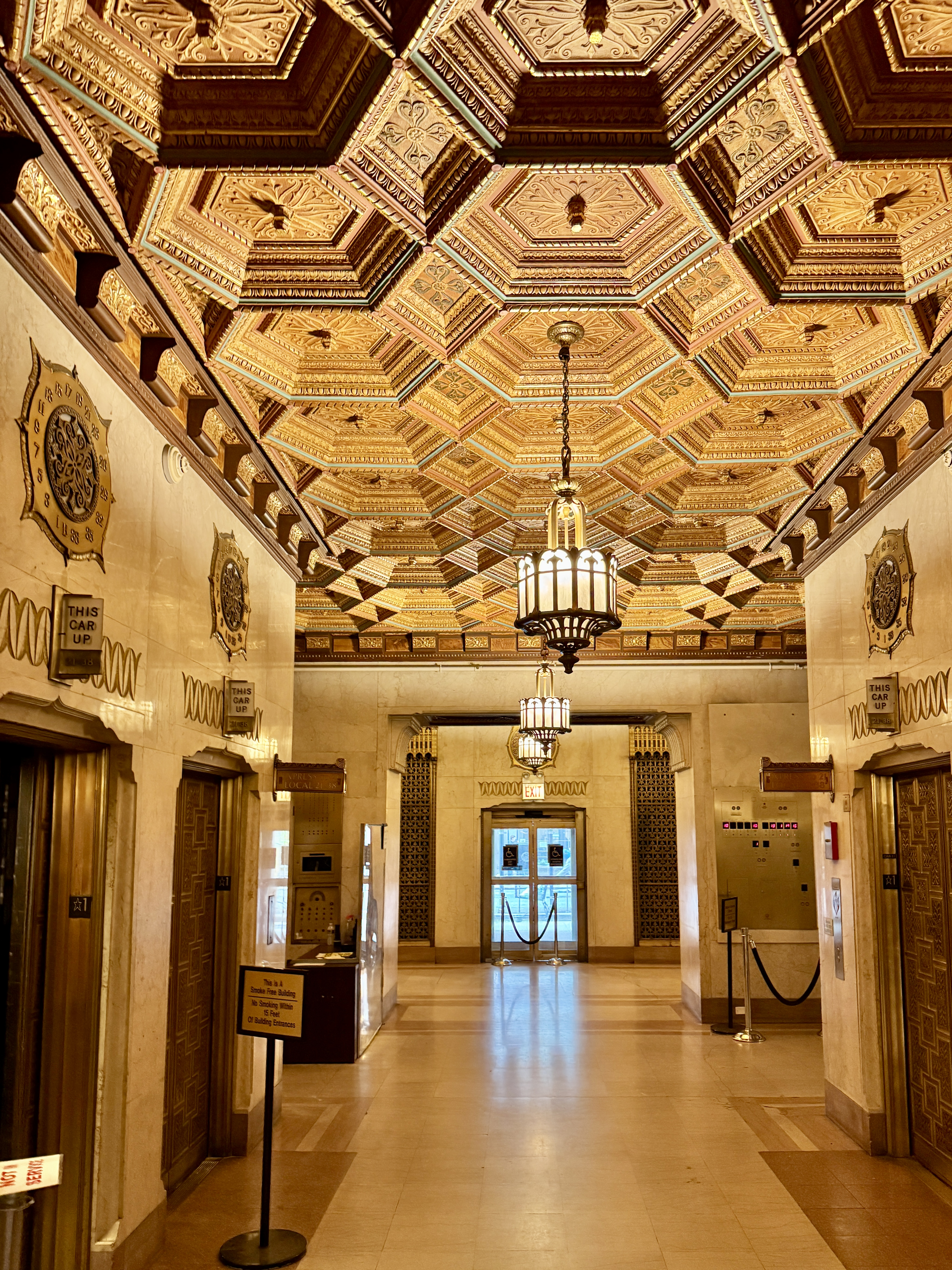

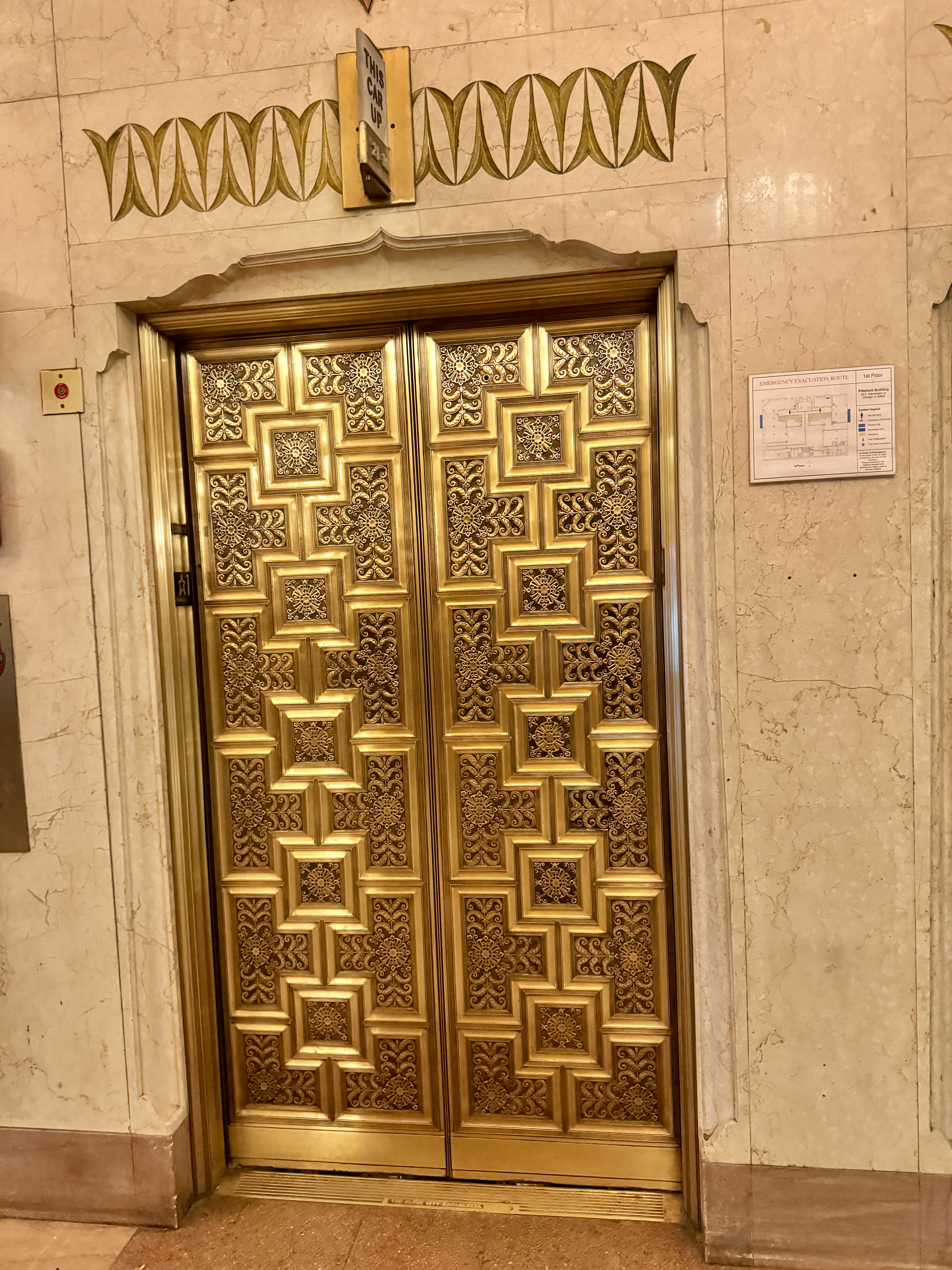

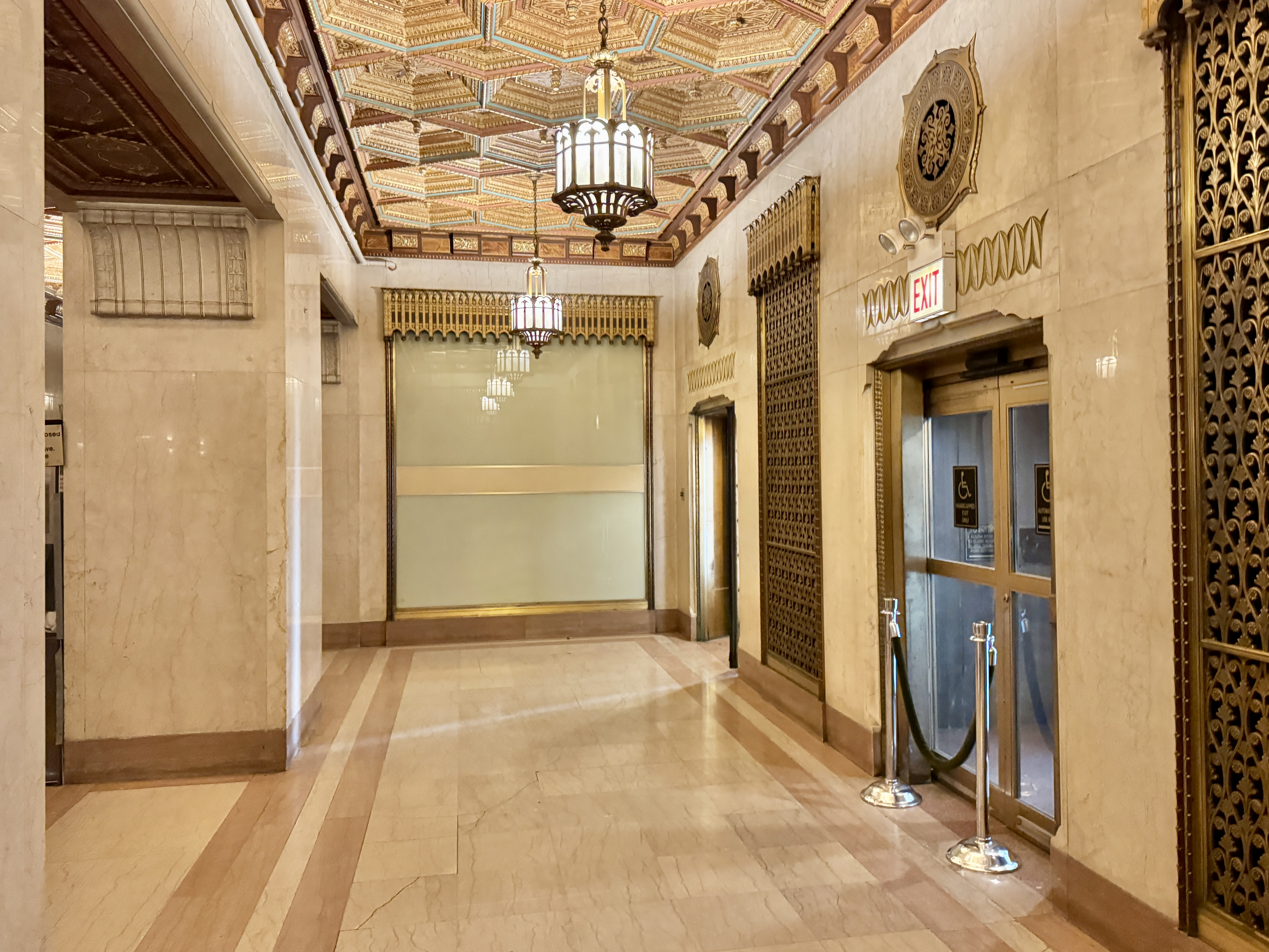

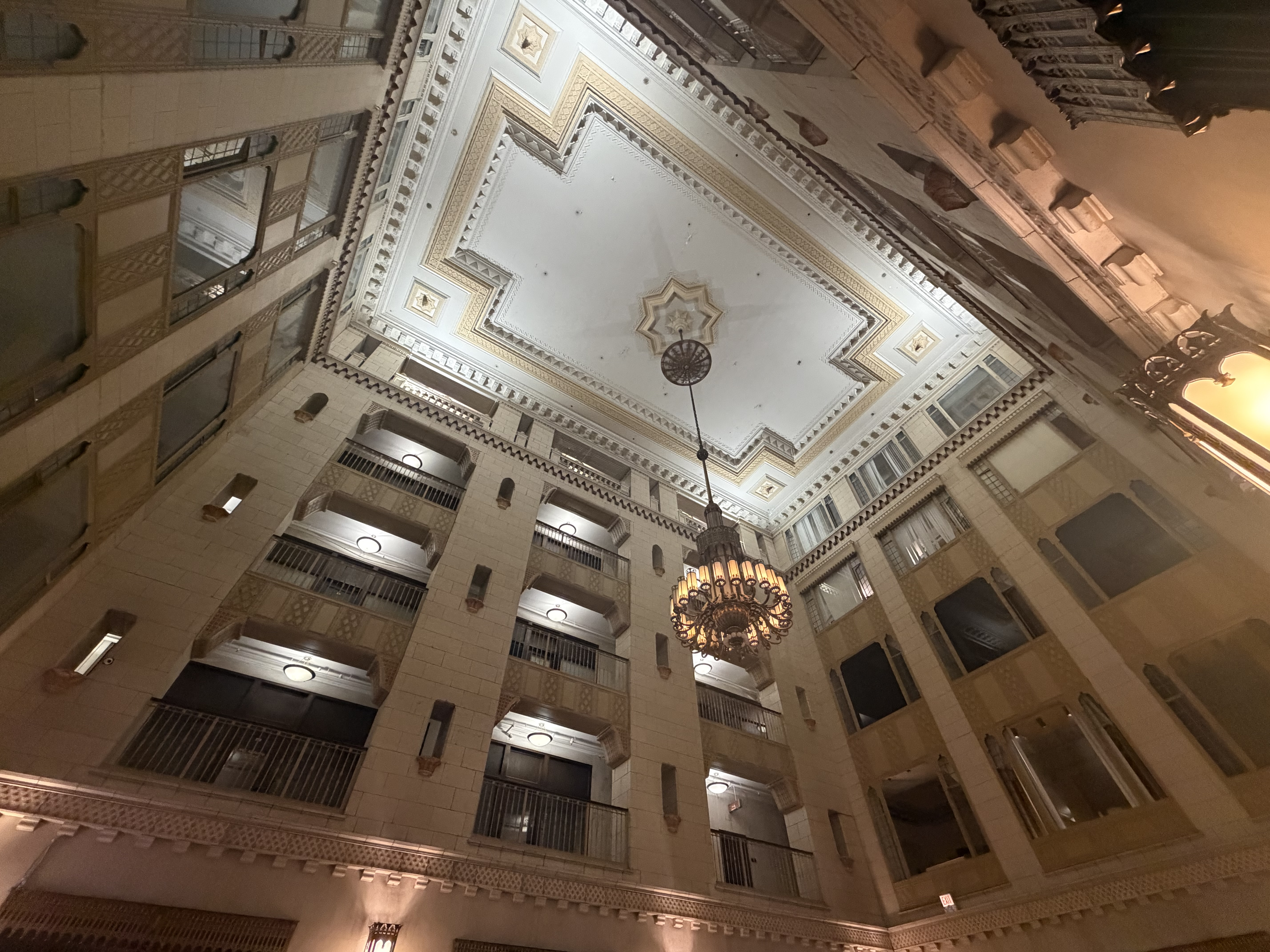
The art deco and gothic style ceiling and chandelier off the Pittsfield building in Chicago Illinois

== Position in Chicago's skyline ==
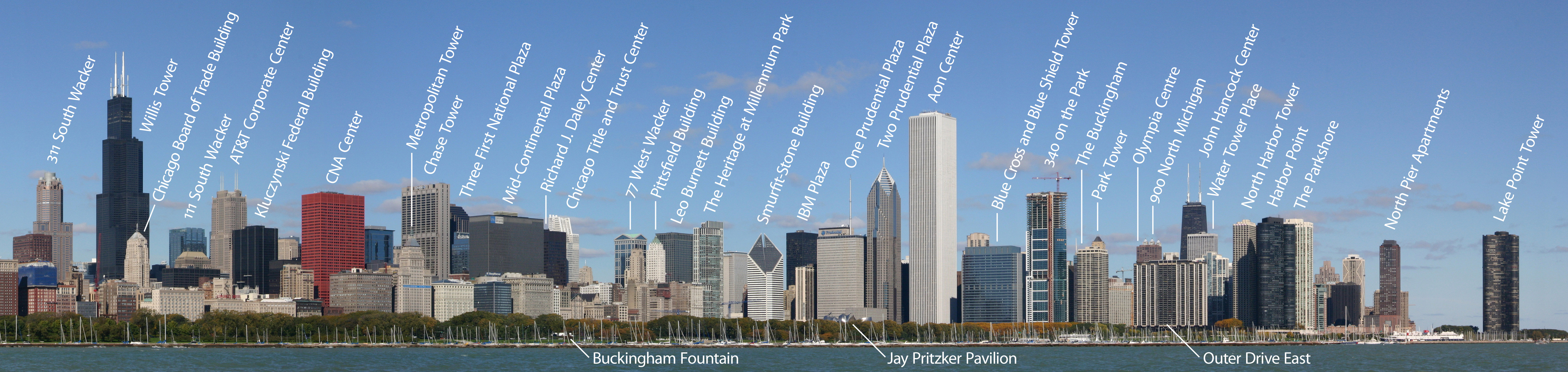

== See also ==
- Chicago architecture
- Chicago Landmark
- List of tallest buildings in Chicago
