= Civic Center (Cleveland) =

Governmental district in Ohio, US

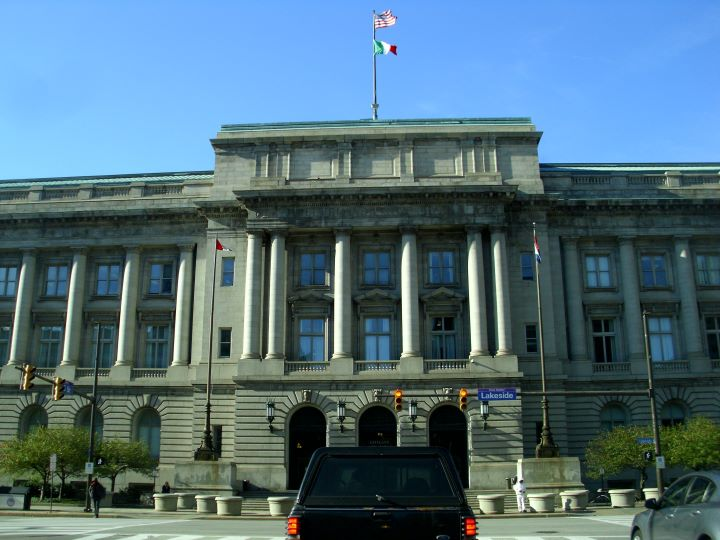
Cleveland City Hall displaying the Italian flag

The Civic Center is a mostly governmental district in downtown Cleveland, Ohio, that is home to the 1916 erected Cleveland City Hall Building. The 1925 Cleveland Public Library main branch, the 1976 massive Cuyahoga County Justice Center, the 419 foot Anthony J. Celebrezze Federal Building (named after the 1953–1962 popular Cleveland Mayor), the Federal Reserve Bank of Cleveland (one of only twelve in the US), the historic Cuyahoga County Courthouse, the Cleveland Public Hall, the Howard M. Metzenbaum U.S. Courthouse which abuts Public Square, and the city-owned greenspace Willard Park which is home to the Free Stamp.

The district is also the site of the headquarters of the Cleveland Division of Police, the historic Standard Building is located across St. Clair Avenue from the CPD HQ, the tallest hotel in the state of Ohio, the 374 foot Hilton Cleveland Downtown Hotel, the new Cleveland Global Center for Health Innovation which is the home to the largest medical mart in the country, the Huntington Convention Center of Cleveland, which is connected to the renovated Public Hall, and the Cleveland Metropolitan School District old Board of Education Main Building all the area in common.

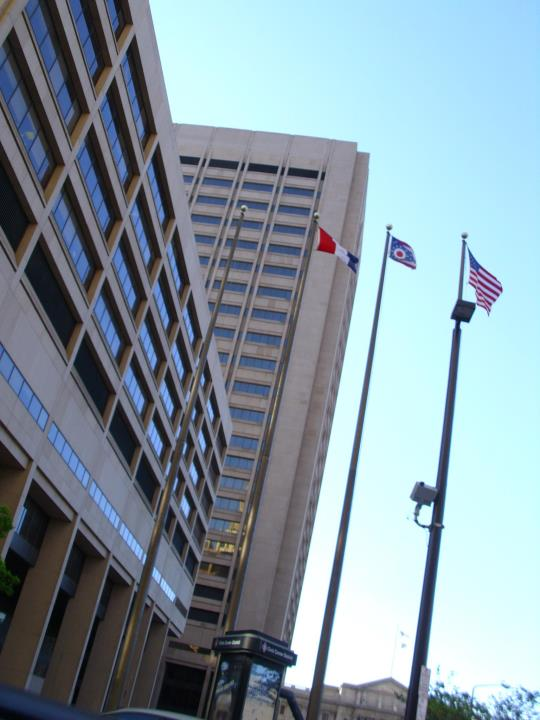
The Cleveland Division of Police Headquarters in the foreground

The Civic Center is bound to the east by the Nine-Twelve District, to the north by North Coast Harbor, to the south by Public Square, and to the west by the Warehouse District. Running through the center of the district is the Cleveland greenway The Mall. In this regard the district is pretty much landlocked. The mall also hosts the Cleveland War Memorial.
