= The Mall (Cleveland) =

- Cleveland Mall
- U.S. National Register of Historic Places
- U.S. Historic district
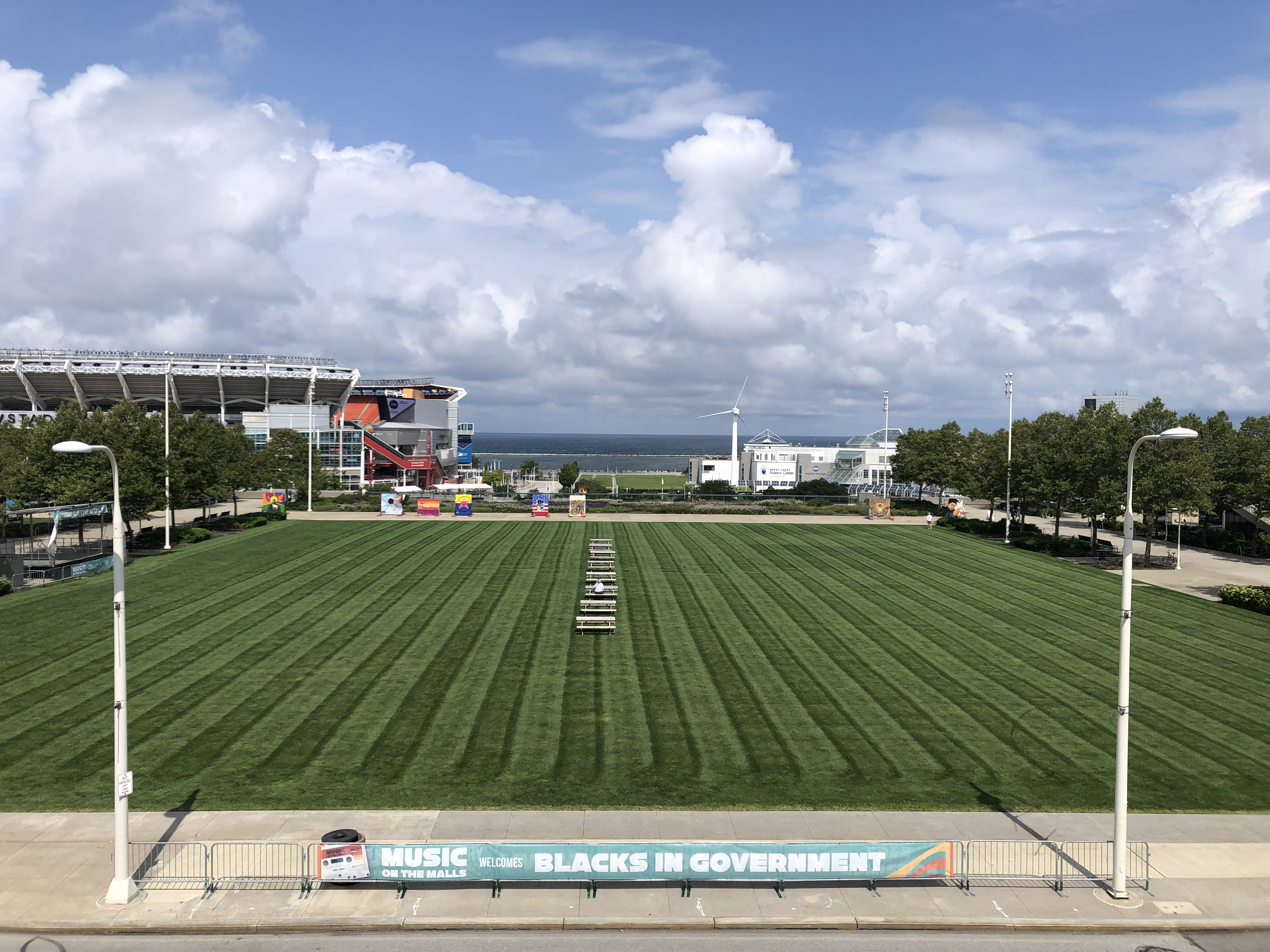
- View of the Mall, looking north, toward Lake Erie

- Location within Ohio Location within the United States
- Location: Roughly T-shaped mall area between E. 9th and W. 3rd Sts., Cleveland, Ohio
- Coordinates: 41.503025°N 81.694143°W
- Area: 26 acres (11 ha)
- Architect: Daniel Burnham, et al.
- Architectural style: Beaux Arts
- NRHP reference No.: 75001360
- Added to NRHP: June 10, 1975

The Cleveland Mall is a landscaped public park in downtown Cleveland, Ohio. One of the most complete examples of City Beautiful design in the United States, the park is a historic site listed on the National Register of Historic Places.

== History ==
The Mall was conceived as part of the 1903 Group Plan by Daniel Burnham, John Carrère, and Arnold Brunner as a vast public space flanked by the city's major civic and governmental buildings, all built in the neoclassical style. Many of those buildings were built over the following three decades, including the Metzenbaum Courthouse (1910), Cuyahoga County Courthouse (1912), Cleveland City Hall (1916), Public Auditorium (1922), the Cleveland Public Library main building (1925), and the Cleveland Public Schools Board of Education building (1931). Other buildings include Key Tower, the Global Center for Health Innovation, the Hilton Cleveland Downtown Hotel, and the Federal Reserve Bank of Cleveland.

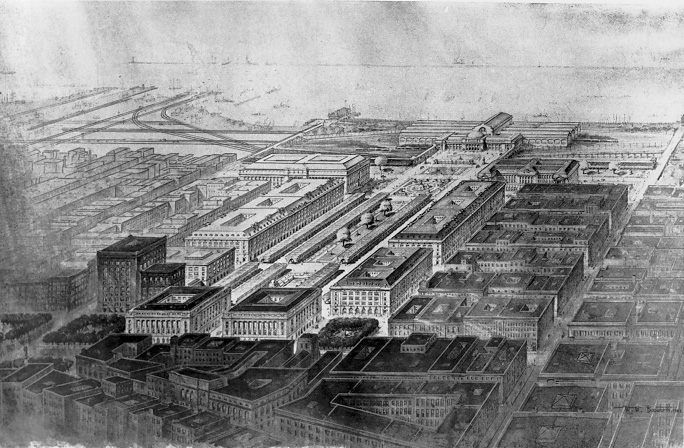
The Group Plan of 1903.

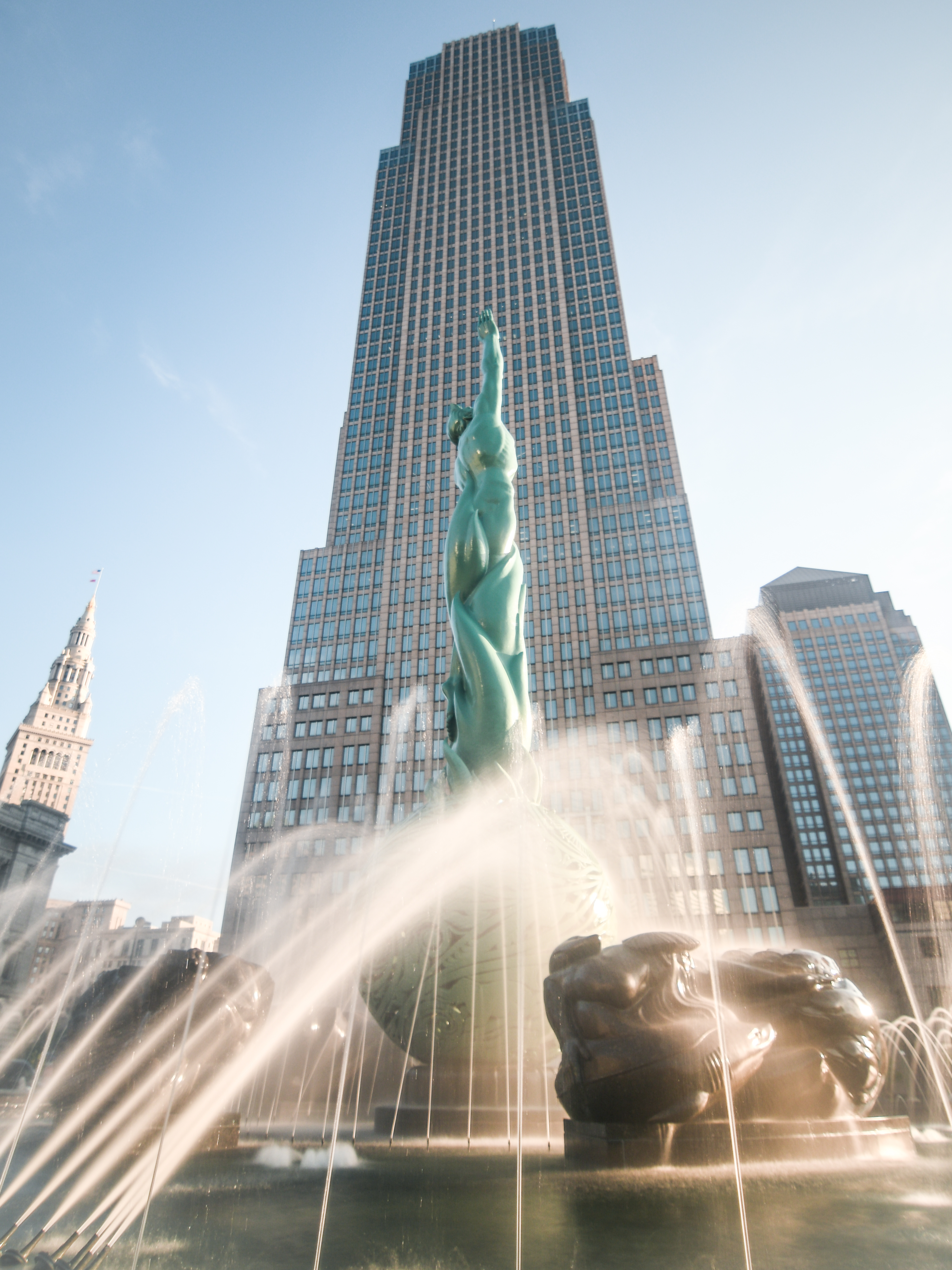
The Fountain of Eternal Life by Marshall Fredericks (1964)

In the spirit of the City Beautiful movement, formerly seedy areas were transformed into a "magnificent civic center", which was supposed to be crowned by the Union Terminal at the north end of the mall, on the shores of Lake Erie. However, the location of the station was eventually moved south and west, to Public Square, where it was finally born as the Terminal Tower. Even though the plan was never fully carried out, it was one of the few City Beautiful plans to be realized to a large extent, and remains one of the most complete examples in the country. The Mall was added to the National Register of Historic Places in 1975.

The Mall is divided into three sections, known as Malls A, B, and C. Mall A, the southernmost, is officially named Veterans' Memorial Plaza, and Mall C was dedicated as Strawbridge Plaza in 2003. The Memorial Plaza, between Rockwell and St. Clair Avenues, is the site of Marshall Fredericks' Fountain of Eternal Life, also known as the War Memorial Fountain. The Cleveland Convention Center was built underneath Malls B and C in 1964. In 2010 the county purchased the underground convention center from the city as part of a project to completely rebuild it in conjunction with constructing the Global Center for Health Innovation and the Hilton Cleveland Downtown Hotel on the former site of the Cuyahoga County Administration Building across from Mall B. The new Huntington Convention Center of Cleveland opened in 2013 and has underground connections to Public Auditorium and the Global Center for Health Innovation. The Hilton officially opened in June 2016. Mall B and Mall C reopened after construction as predominantly grassy areas, with Mall B reaching 27 feet (8.2 m) above sidewalk level over the entrance to the Cleveland Convention Center along Lakeside Avenue.

== Public art ==
Cleveland Public Art sponsored a series of temporary public art installations on Mall B. In 2004, New York artist Brian Tolle installed For the gentle wind doth move Silently, invisibly. The work featured eight nine-foot-tall styrofoam neoclassical urns standing atop pedestals, warped to reflect actual wind data collected from Lake Erie. The sculptures were taken down in 2006. In May 2008, Peter North and Alissa North of North Design Office in Toronto installed a work titled The Verdant Walk. It featured plantings of native grasses and seven fabric-covered sculptures. The sculptures were illuminated at night via a solar-powered LED system. They remained in place until 2010.

After the reconstruction of the Mall, Stephen Manka's sculpture City of Light was installed on Mall B. The illuminated steel sculpture was created for the 2013 National Senior Games. Manka described it as intended to "simulate the flames of the classic games with a wash of programmable light" and "part petal of a flower, part heavy duty turbine".
