= Cleveland Landmarks Commission =

The Cleveland Landmarks Commission is a commission responsible for determining whether buildings, sites or historic districts are eligible for designation as landmarks in the city of Cleveland, Ohio. As Cleveland has many historic streets, districts, and buildings, the commission is charged with weeding out what buildings, districts, and streets are of potential interest to the people of Cleveland, Ohio and the nation of the United States in general. Two of the oldest buildings in the city that are listed on the Landmarks Commission are the 1824 Dunham Tavern Museum (which is located in the Central neighborhood of the city) and the 1855 Old Stone Church located on Public Square.

== The list ==
This is a partial list of buildings that are listed on the website of the City of Cleveland and that largely already have a presence on wiki pages. The list is broken down by Cleveland neighborhood.

=== Downtown ===
- East 4th Street District
- Caxton Building
- Cleveland City Hall
- Cleveland Grays Armory
- Cleveland Public Library main branch
- Cuyahoga County Courthouse
- 1717 East Ninth Building
- Fenn Tower at Cleveland State University (CSU)
- Guardian Bank Building
- Mather Mansion at CSU
- May Company Building
- Old Stone Church
- Playhouse Square (Cleveland's Theatre District)
- Public Hall (not including the 2013 Huntington Convention Center of Cleveland)
- Public Square (Cleveland's central plaza)
- Rose Building
- St. John's Cathedral (The Roman Catholic Diocese of Cleveland's mother church)
- Soldiers and Sailors Monument
- Standard Building
- Warehouse District

=== University ===
- Case Western Reserve University (several buildings)
- Church of the Covenant
- Cleveland Cultural Gardens in Rockefeller Park
- Cleveland Museum of Art (1916 and 1971 buildings)
- Garfield Memorial
- Lakeview Cemetery
- Little Italy
- Severance Hall
- Stager-Beckwith Mansion

=== Ohio City ===
- Carnegie West Branch of Cleveland Public Library
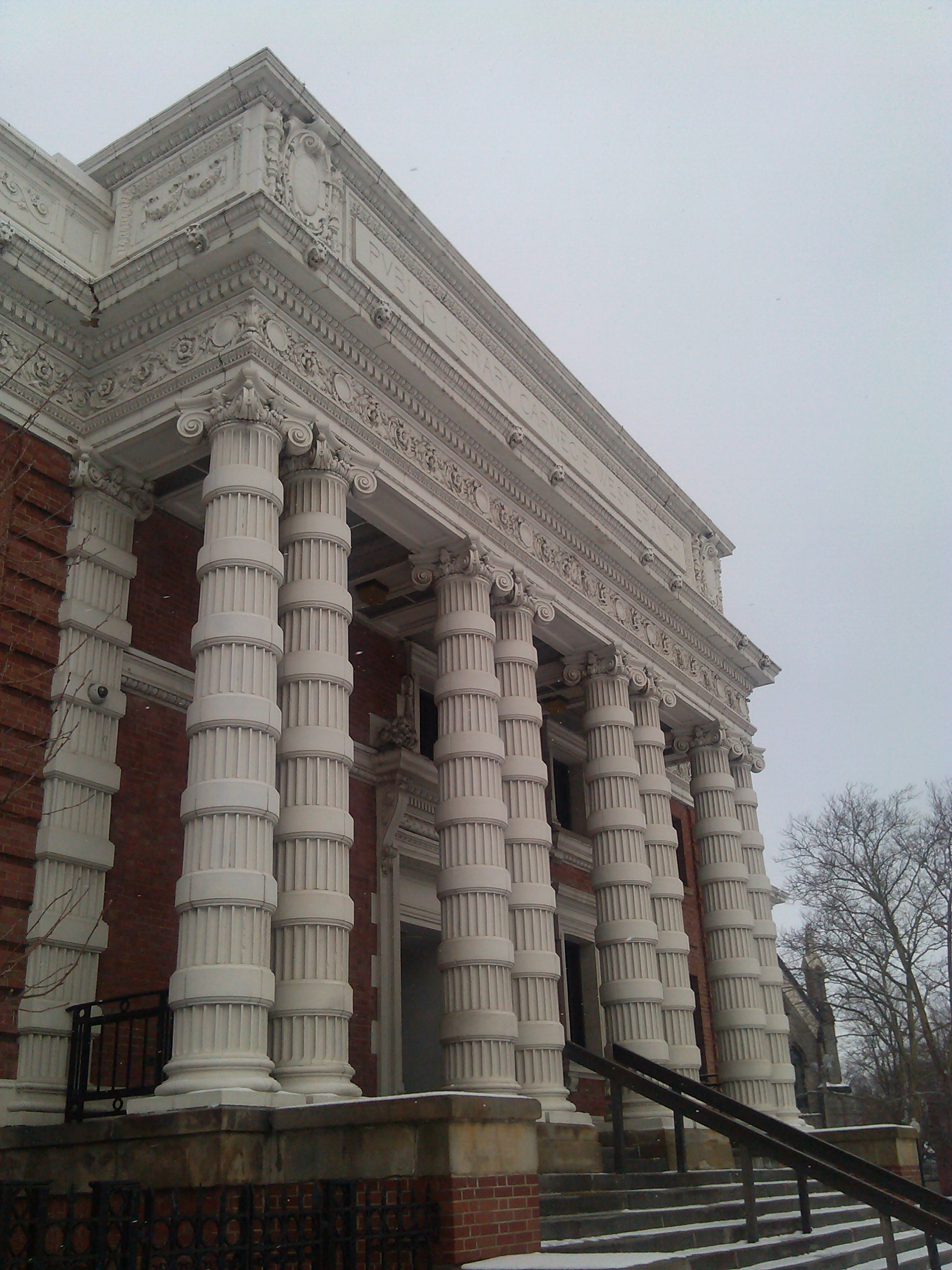
  Carnegie West Branch of Cleveland Public Library
- Market Square
- West Side Market

=== Tremont ===
- A Christmas Story House
- St. Theodosius Russian Orthodox Cathedral

=== Detroit–Shoreway ===
- Gordon Square
