= Cleveland City Hall =

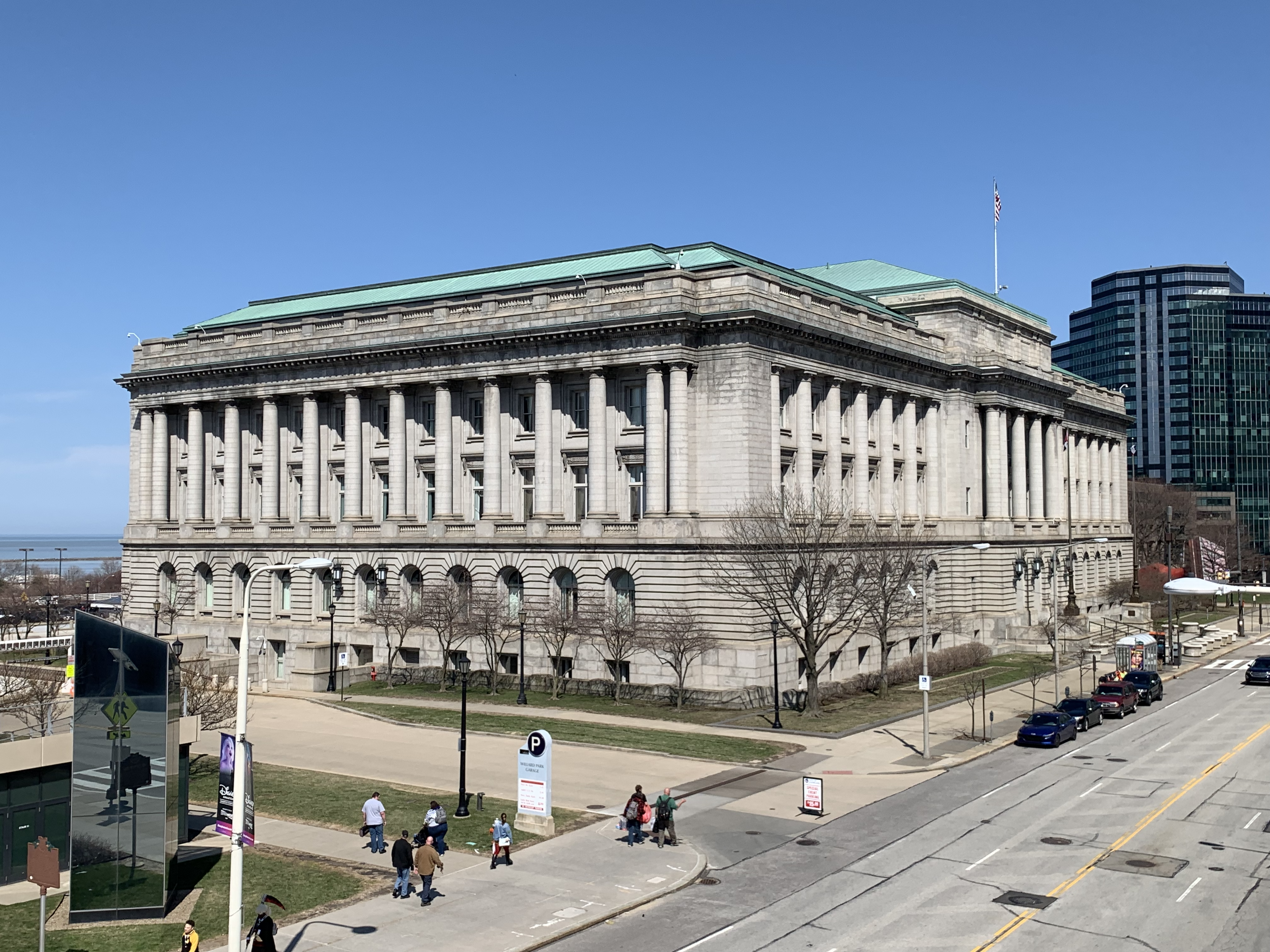

- Location within Cleveland

General information
- Type: Government offices
- Location: 601 Lakeside Avenue Cleveland, Ohio 44114
- Coordinates: 41°30′18″N 81°41′38″W
- Construction started: 1912
- Completed: 1916
- Cost: $3 million (equivalent to $89 million today)

Technical details
- Floor count: 5

Design and construction
- Architect: J. Milton Dyer

Other information
- Public transit access: East 9th–North Coast

Cleveland City Hall is the seat of government for the City of Cleveland, Ohio, and the home of Cleveland City Council and the office of the Mayor of Cleveland. It opened in 1916 and is located at 601 Lakeside Avenue in the Civic Center area of Downtown Cleveland. The building was the first of its kind designed by Cleveland architect J. Milton Dyer for governmental purposes for a major U.S. city. At the time of its construction, City Hall was to continue the city planning of Daniel Burnham's 1903 Group Plan. City Hall stands as a historic landmark that was added to the Cleveland Landmarks Commission.

The rotunda in the building has been the site of numerous weddings, rallies, protests, and galas. The body of U.S. Representative Louis Stokes lay in state in the rotunda for the public to pay their respects after his death in 2015.

== Construction ==
The original design had been finalized by 1907 and features Neoclassical elements, but it would take nearly 10 more years before that design would be realized. By the time of its construction, Dyer had undertaken several important building commissions in the Cleveland area and was known for his ornate but refined style of architecture. The building cost $3 million in 1916 (equivalent to $89 million in 2025) and took nearly five years to complete with construction commencing in 1912. The building is located on the bluff that overlooks the North Coast Harbor district that abuts Lake Erie and the Port of Cleveland.

The Cleveland City Council Chambers underwent major renovations in 1951 and 1977. However, the outside of the building has remained largely unchanged since 1916, save for normal repairs, refittings and the usual upkeep of the superstructure. City Hall stands next to Willard Park and The Mall and is across the street from Public Hall.

== Occupants ==
The following city agencies are in building:

- Mayor's Office Subdivisions
- Building and Housing
- Civil Service Commission
- Community Development
- Community Relations
- Finance
- Law
- Personnel and Human Resources
- Public Safety

The city of Cleveland has numerous other agencies and departments spread throughout downtown buildings, these include, Carl B. Stokes Public Works Building which is headquarters to Cleveland Division of Water, the Tower at Erieview, Cleveland Public Powerhouse and Public Hall, among others. As with other major U.S. cities as the city expanded and diversified, the City Hall building could no longer house all of the needed departments.

== See also ==
- Downtown Cleveland
- Civic Center (Cleveland)
