= The Spirit of Detroit =

Sculpture by Marshall Fredericks

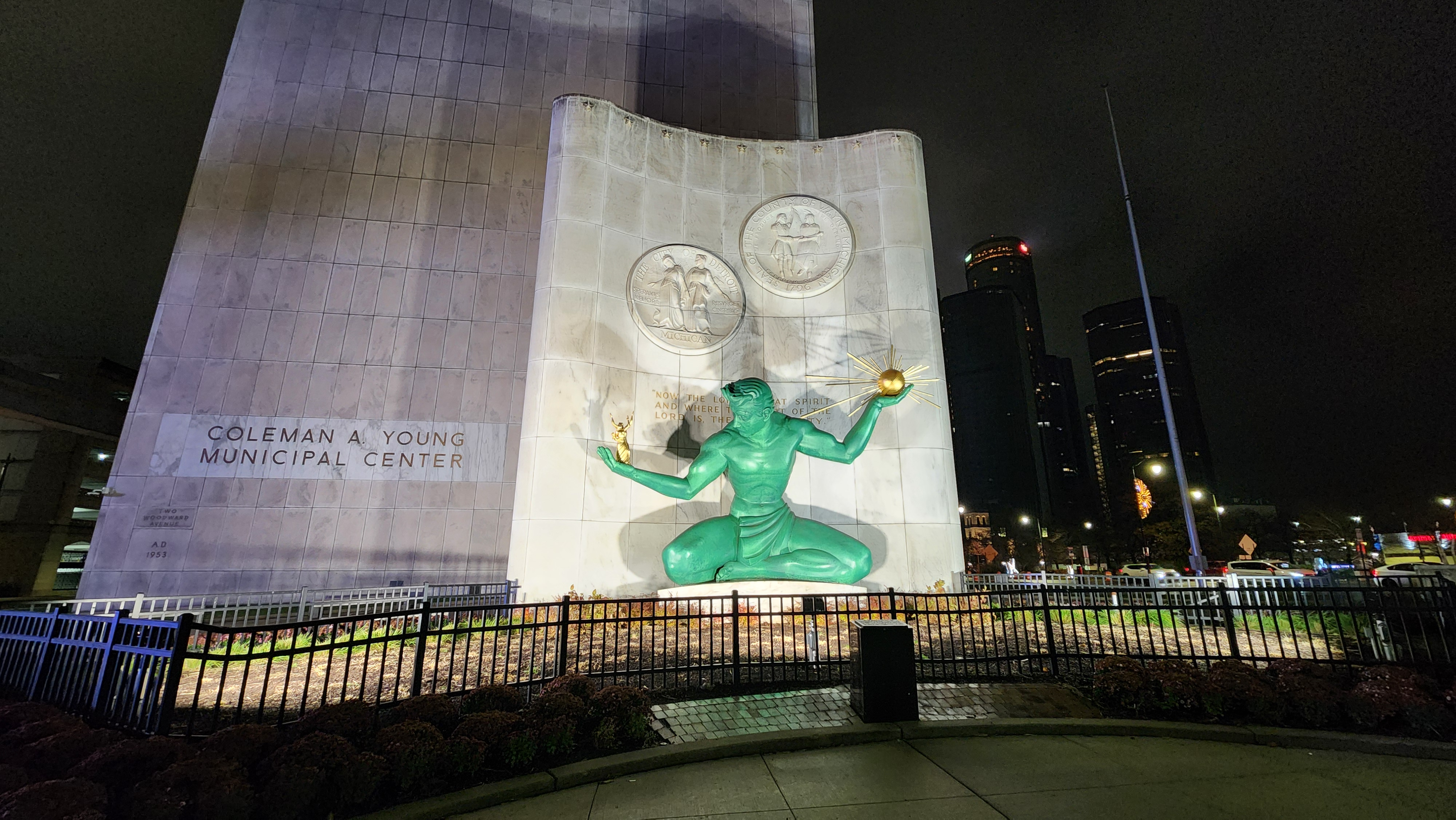
- The Spirit of Detroit in November 2025
- Artist: Marshall Fredericks
- Year: 1958
- Type: Bronze
- Dimensions: 790 cm (312 in)
- Weight: 9 tons
- Location: Detroit, Michigan, U.S.; 42°19′45.47″N 83°2′40.66″W
- Owner: Detroit-Wayne Joint Building Authority

The Spirit of Detroit (1958) is a monument with a large bronze statue created by Marshall Fredericks, located outside of the Coleman A. Young Municipal Center in Detroit, Michigan. It is one of the largest bronze statues in the United States, and was the largest bronze statue cast since the Renaissance at the time of its dedication. It is a major landmark in Detroit, and has become recognized as a symbol of the city.

== Description ==
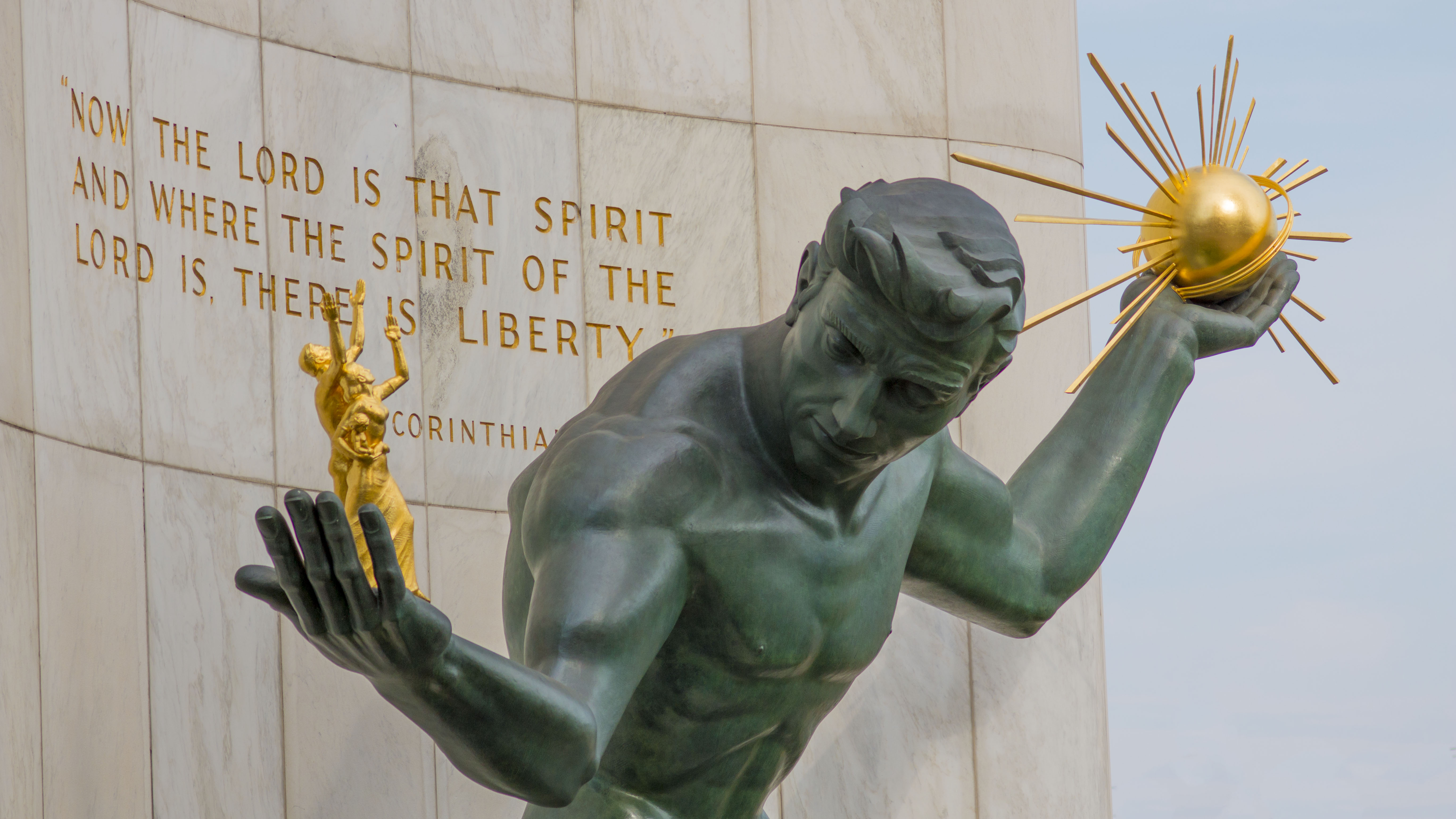
Detail of the statue

The 26-foot (7.9 m) tall, 22-foot (6.7 m) wide, 9-ton sculpture depicts a man wearing a cloth, seated on a 60-ton marble base. The figure holds a gilt bronze sphere, emanating rays to symbolize God, in its left hand; and smaller golden bronze statues of a man, a woman, and a child, symbolizing human relationships, in its right. It was cast in Oslo, Norway.

Behind the sculpture is a 36-by-45-foot (11 m × 14 m) curved white marble wall, bearing the seals of the City of Detroit and Wayne County. The Wayne County seal was created by Fredericks as part of The Spirit of Detroit, as the county had no seal at the time; the seal is still used today and is featured on the county's flag. Immediately behind the statue and below the seals, the wall includes an inscription from 2 Corinthians (3:17):

"NOW THE LORD IS THAT SPIRIT
AND WHERE THE SPIRIT OF THE
LORD IS, THERE IS LIBERTY."
II CORINTHIANS 3:17

Fredericks did not originally name the sculpture; it gained its common name from the Bible inscription.

A plaque in front of the sculpture reads: "The artist expresses the concept that God, through the spirit of man, is manifested in the family, the noblest human relationship."

== History ==
The Spirit of Detroit (1959) (13:24)
A 1959 documentary about the statue from its inception in 1955 to its inauguration in 1958

The sculpture was commissioned on August 2, 1955, at a cost of $58,000 (equivalent to $415,000 in 2024), though Fredericks waived the commissioning cost, considering the creation of the sculpture his civic duty. As part of the design of the divine elements of the sculpture, Fredericks met with several religious groups. Fredericks shipped a scale model from the United States to Oslo, Norway for casting. After casting, the sculpture underwent acidic treatments for several weeks to oxidize the bronze and to create the warm, aged green color. the thickness of the bronze is 3/8 inches up to 1.5 inches. Steel framework was constructed to protect the sculpture during transport. Additional protection for the sculpture was provided using wooden beams, wooden platforms, and burlap covering, for a total shipping weight of 12 tons. For shipping, the sculpture was placed face down on a wooden platform. The sculpture was transported by the Fjell Line, who chartered the German freighter Thomas Schulte. After the 4,800 mile journey across the Atlantic Ocean and through the Saint Lawrence Seaway, the freighter arrived at the Port of Detroit on September 20, 1958. The Thomas Schulte was the only freighter with sufficient below deck storage space to accommodate the sculpture while still being able to navigate the Saint Lawrence Seaway.

As part of the shipment, four miniature scale models of the sculpture were included to aid with customs clearance. The sculpture was delivered to the Detroit City-County Building (now the Coleman A. Young Municipal Center) and installed onto the marble base for the September 23, 1958, dedication ceremony.

The Marshall M. Fredericks Sculpture Museum has the original plaster head for The Spirit of Detroit, as well as a quarter-scale plaster model.

=== Maintenance and restorations ===
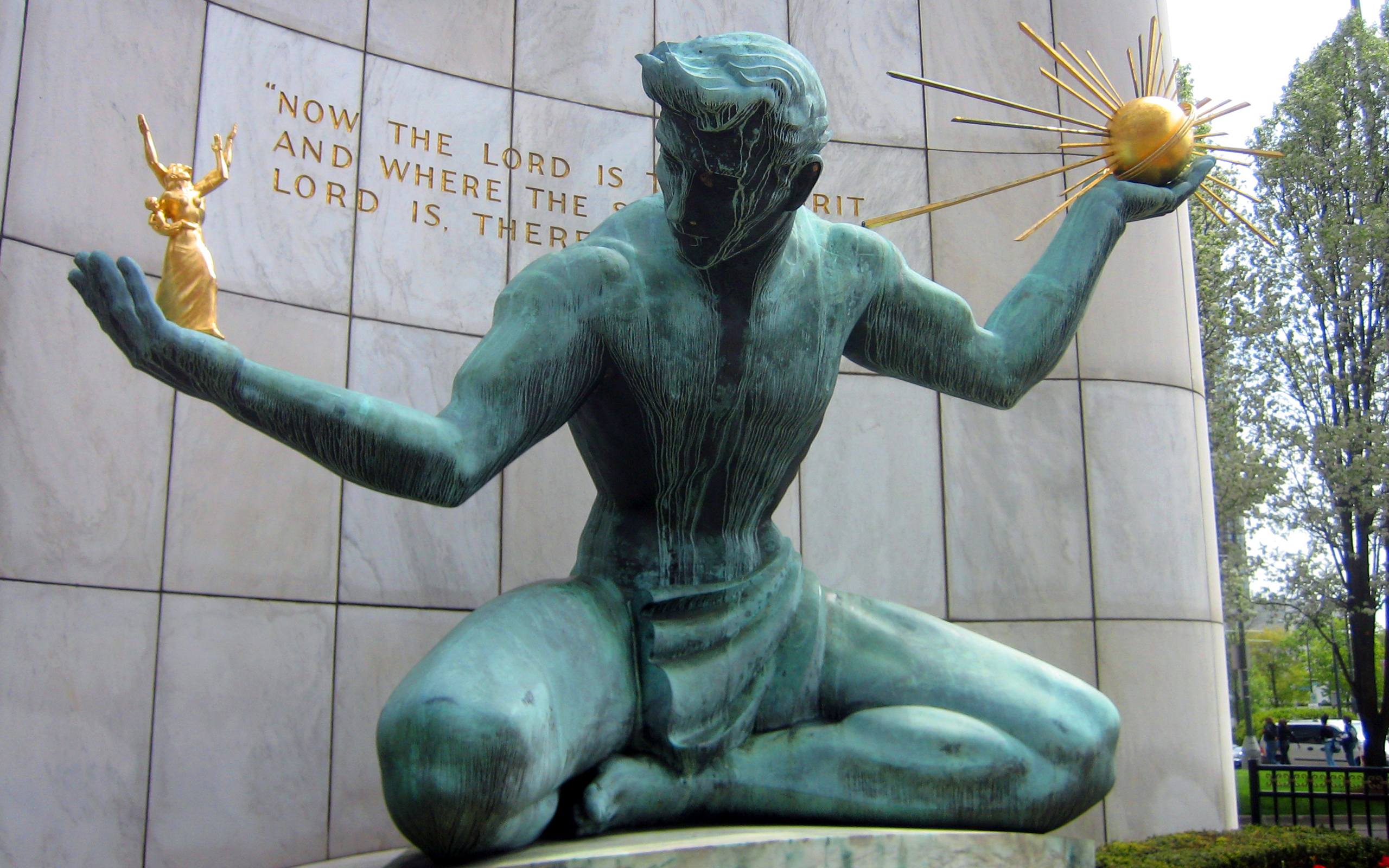
The Spirit of Detroit prior to its 2006 restoration, with visible verdigris

The sculpture has regular maintenance, as well as restorations. Once a year, the sculpture is cleaned with non-ionic, biogradable detergents, and customized petroleum-based waxes are used for protection. The annual maintenance also includes applying heat to the bronze surface and cupric nitrate in order to preserve the green color and patina. In 1984, the sculpture was covered in plastic while the marble panels behind the statue were replaced. The statue underwent a restoration in 2006, funded by foundations and other private donations.

In 2013, art dealer and art historian Eric Ian Hornak Spoutz was quoted in The Detroit News stating that the value of the statue is in excess of $1 million. In 2017, the Detroit-Wayne Joint Building Authority said that based on the most recent appraisal of the sculpture, it would cost $6 million to repair significant damage.

For the sculpture's 50th anniversary, funds from operational savings and energy conservation totalling $170,000 were used for restoration improvements. In 2018, the sculpture had routine maintenance completed which involved touching up the green patina, as well as the gold figures and sphere. On September 21, 2018, the City of Detroit had a ceremony to celebrate the 60th anniversary of the sculpture.

In 2017, Spirit Plaza was initially constructed and subsequent upgrades completed in 2019 and paid for by $800,000 in bond funds have yielded a 20,000 square-foot plaza with a playground, stationary musical instruments, tables, chairs, vehicle charging stations, and drinking fountains.

Another extensive restoration took place in 2024, when local artist Robert Zahorsky removed and re-applied the chemical coating over a span of seven weeks.

== Uses as a community symbol ==
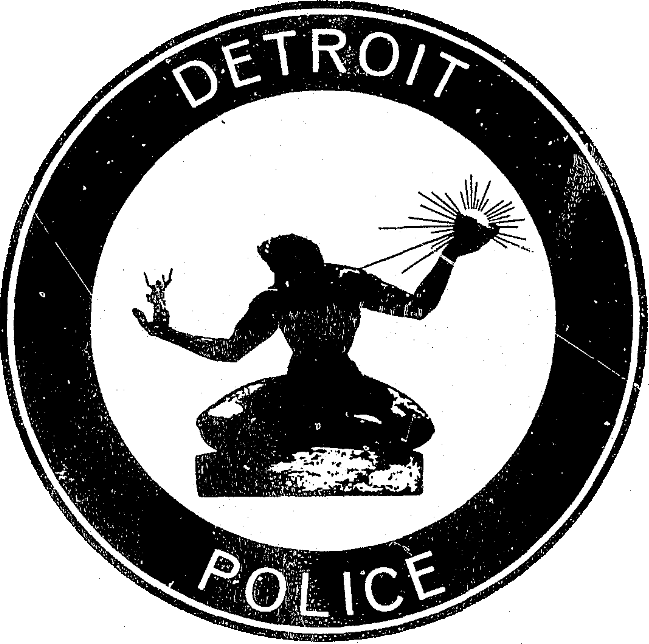
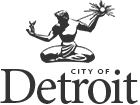
The Spirit of Detroit is featured on official city insignia, such as Detroit Police Department seal and the former city logo.

As one of Detroit's most easily identifiable landmarks, The Spirit of Detroit has become recognized as a symbol of the city. It is depicted in the logos of the City of Detroit and most of its departments, and inspired the green color scheme used in most city branding since the 2010s.

It has notably been featured in the logo of the Detroit Police Department since the 1970s, and featured prominently on its police cars in the 1980s and 1990s. It is portrayed in the livery of some Detroit Department of Transportation buses, and featured prominently on Detroit Community Scrip. It is also pictured on the namesake Spirit of Detroit Award, issued by the Detroit City Council to a person, event, or organization deemed to have performed an outstanding achievement or service to the citizens of Detroit.

A stylized version of The Spirit of Detroit was incorporated into the former logo of Detroit Edison (now DTE Energy). It is also depicted in the crest of Detroit City Football Club.

The Spirit of Detroit often represents Detroit in popular media, such as in the 1998 film Out of Sight, Chrysler's 2011 Super Bowl commercial, and the 2018 video game Detroit: Become Human.

=== Clothing ===
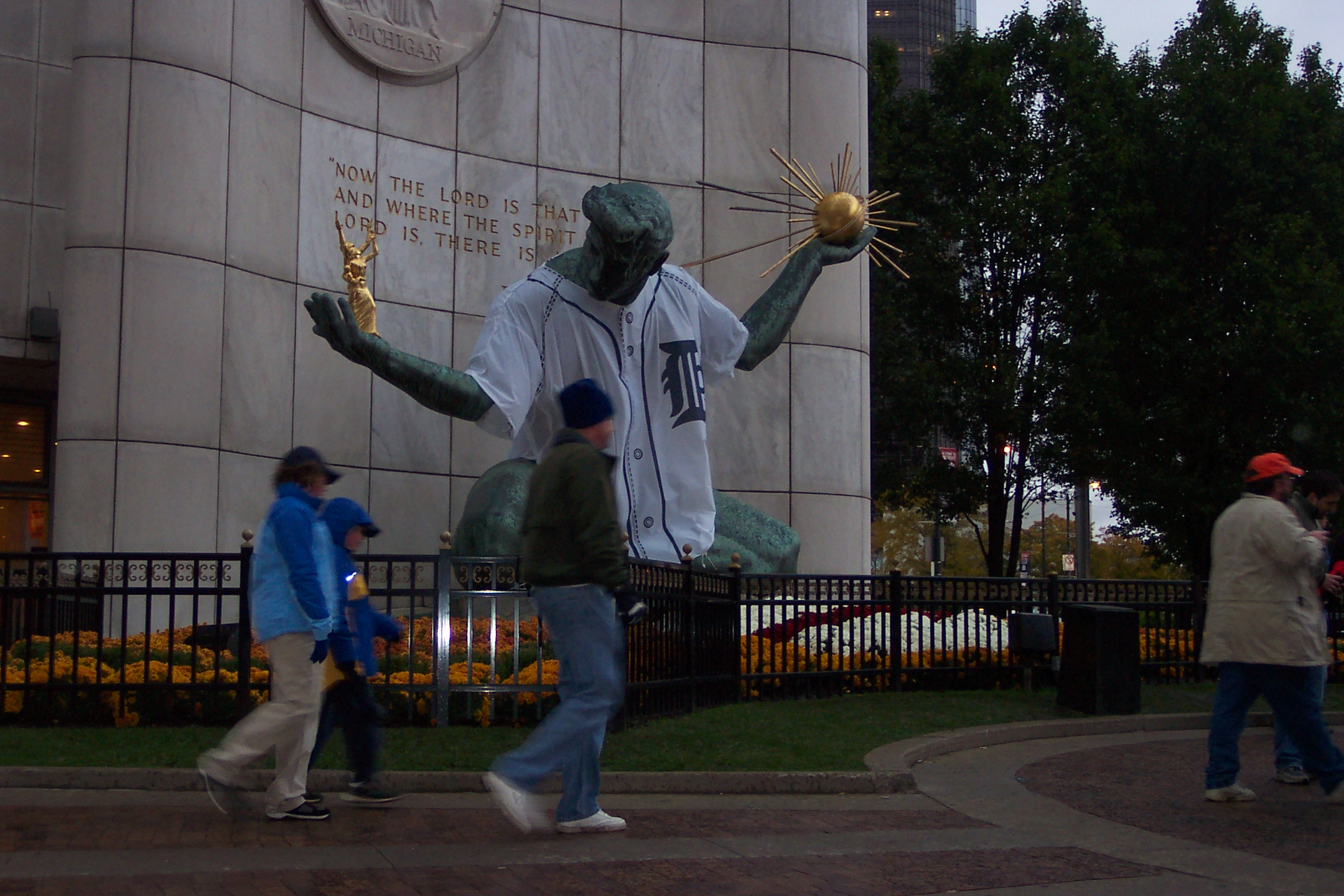
The statue wearing a Detroit Tigers uniform during the 2006 Major League Baseball postseason

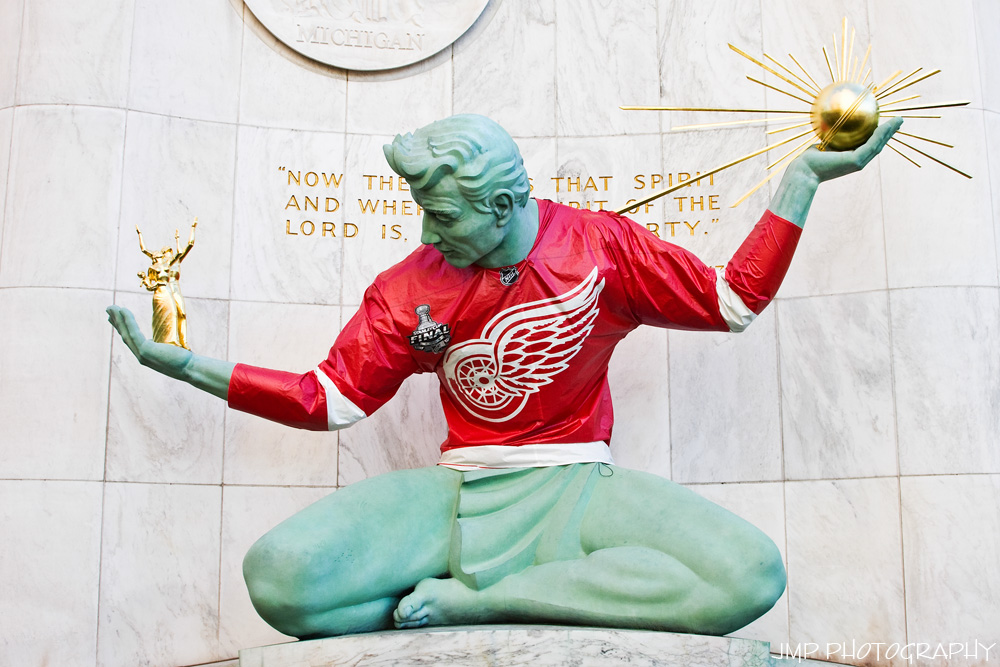
The statue wearing a Detroit Red Wings sweater during the 2009 Stanley Cup Final

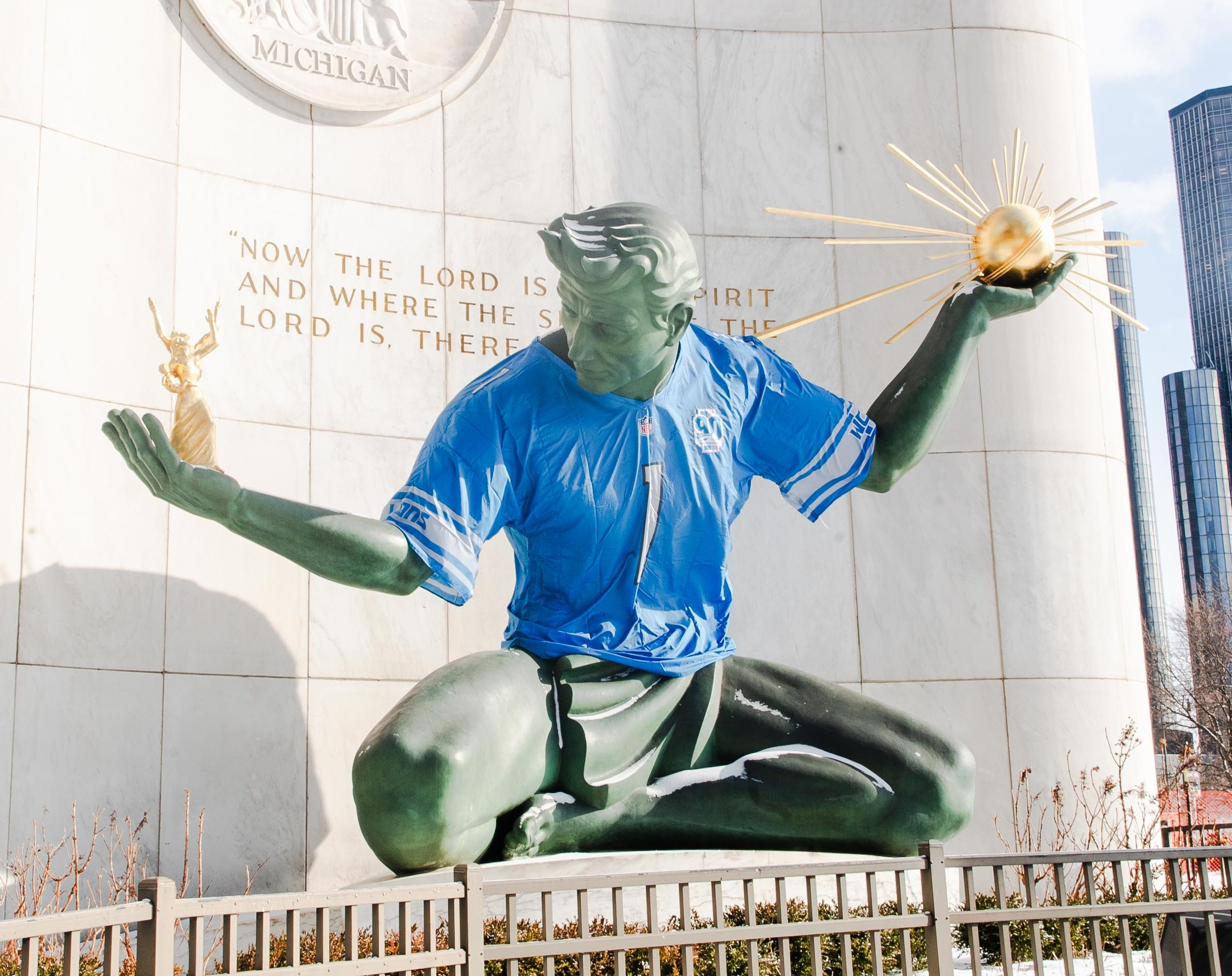
The statue wearing a Detroit Lions jersey during the 2023–24 NFL playoffs

Since the late 1990s, it has become customary to dress the statue with oversized clothing during major events in the city. Notably, it has often worn the jerseys of Detroit's professional sports teams when they are competing in the playoffs.

Other notable outfits worn by the statue include:

- a tuxedo, during a 1999 visit by The Three Tenors,
- branded jerseys during Super Bowl XL in 2006 and the 2024 NFL draft,
- a purple shirt and bow tie, commemorating the Detroit Youth Choir's 2019 appearance on America's Got Talent,
- a white ribbon and turquoise t-shirt resembling scrubs, supporting healthcare workers during the COVID-19 pandemic in 2020.

Beginning in 2017, the Detroit-Wayne Joint Building Authority began to restrict statue decorations, amid concerns about damage to the sculpture. A $25,000 fee was instituted, intended to cover the cost of restoration after decorations are removed, including cleaning, reapplying the patina, and waxing. From 2017 to 2020, sports teams' decorations were only permitted after a team won a national championship; since 2020, they are permitted whenever a team is "in championship contention."

The ceremonial naming of the section of the John C. Lodge Freeway running from Livernois to I-94 in honor of Aretha Franklin was held in front of the sculpture in 2019. Spirit Plaza was the site of a floral tribute, which included 3,000 roses, that commemorated Big Sean's Detroit 2 album release on September 4, 2020.

== See also ==
- Detroit
- Bronze sculpture
- Marshall M. Fredericks Sculpture Museum
- Portlandia
