= Fountain of Eternal Life =

Statue in Ohio

Coordinates: 41.5017°N 81.6929°W

- War Memorial Fountain, Peace Arising from the Flames of War
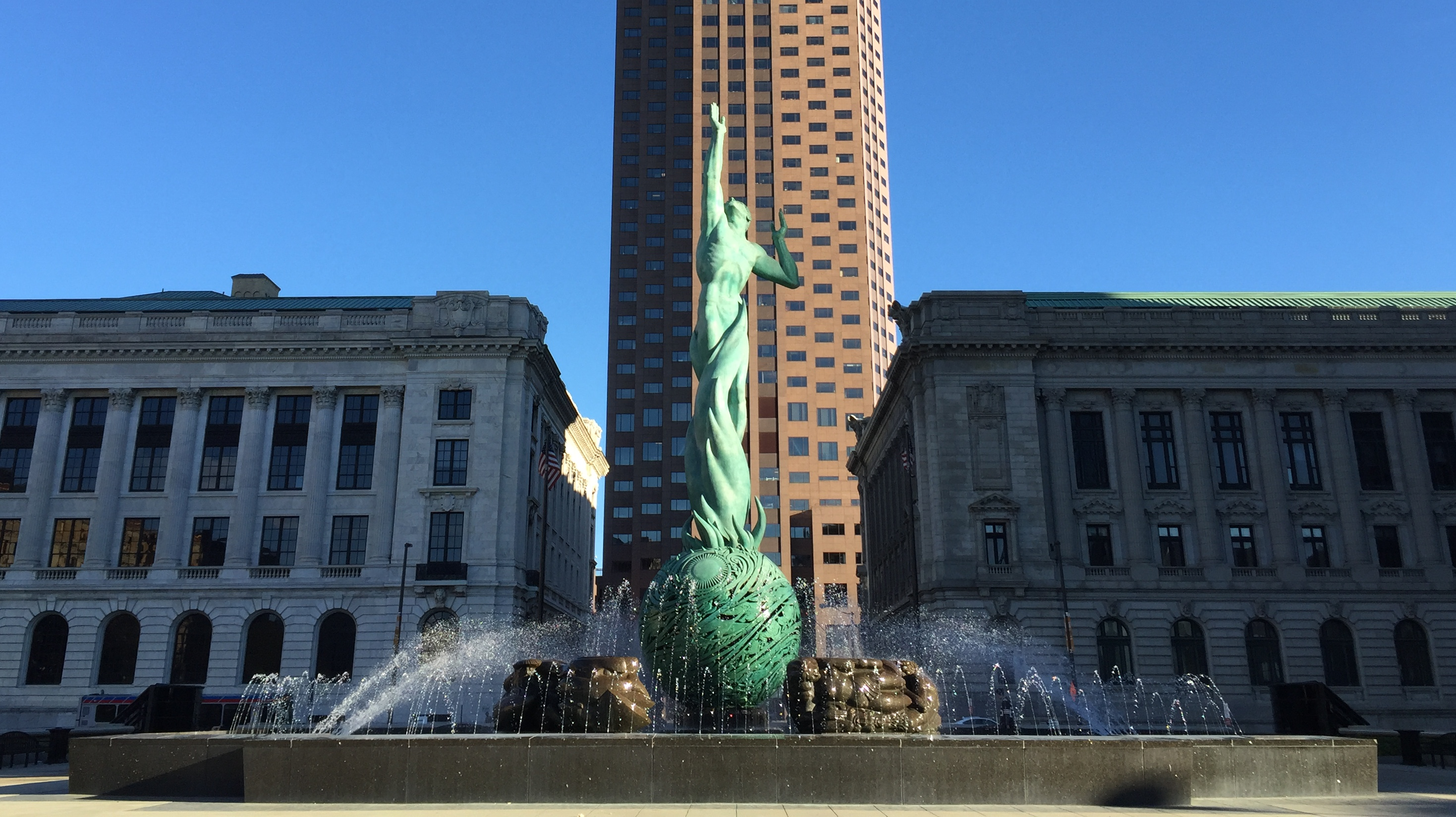
- Artist: Marshall Fredericks
- Year: 1964
- Completion date: 30 May 1964
- Location: Cleveland, Ohio

The Fountain of Eternal Life, also known as the War Memorial Fountain and Peace Arising from the Flames of War, is a statue and fountain in downtown Cleveland, Ohio designed by Cleveland Institute of Art graduate Marshall Fredericks and dedicated on May 30, 1964. The sculpture, which honors Greater Clevelanders who served, died, or were declared missing in military service, is situated on Veterans' Memorial Plaza (formerly Mall A) as part of the Cleveland Mall.

== History ==
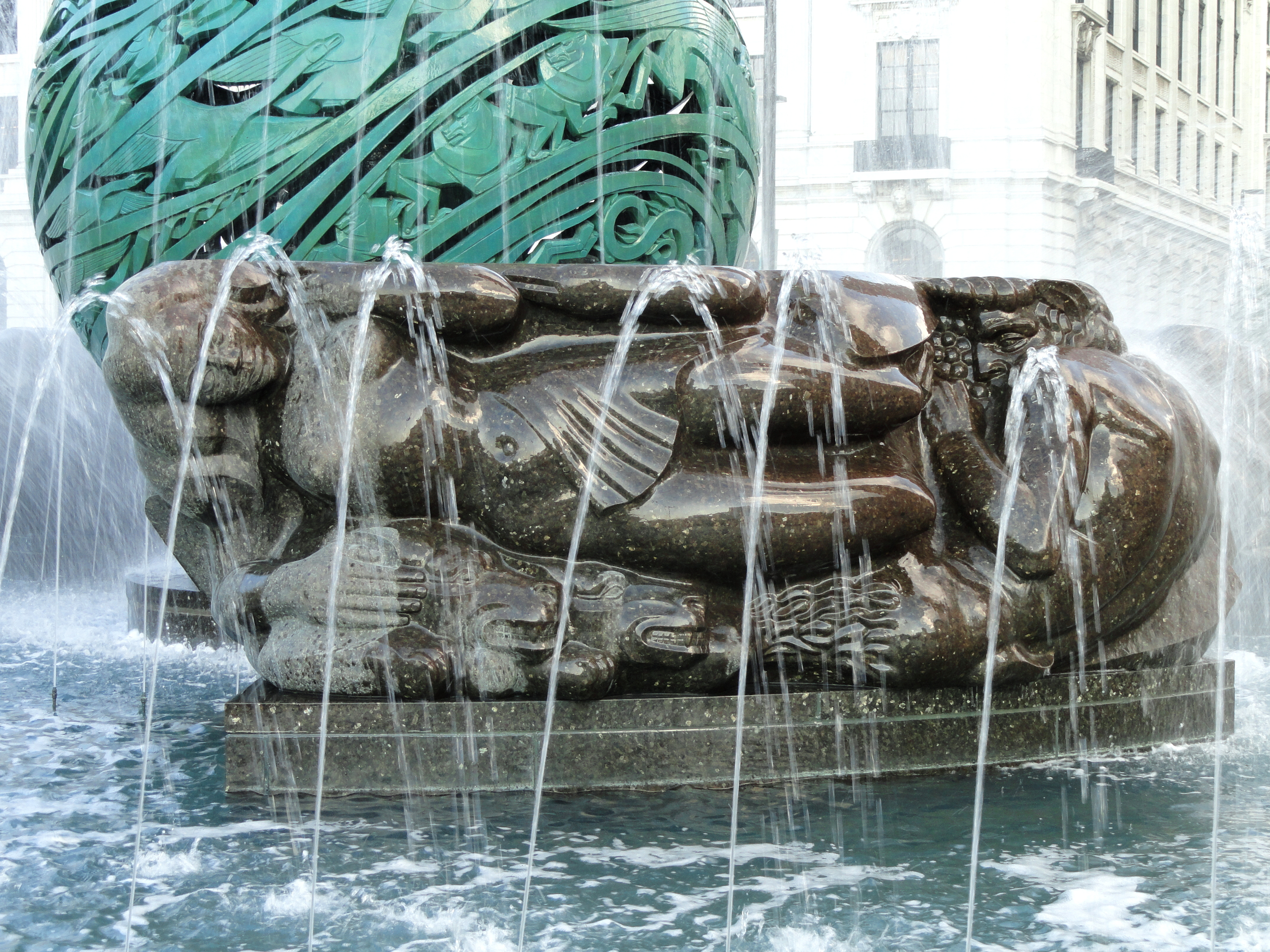
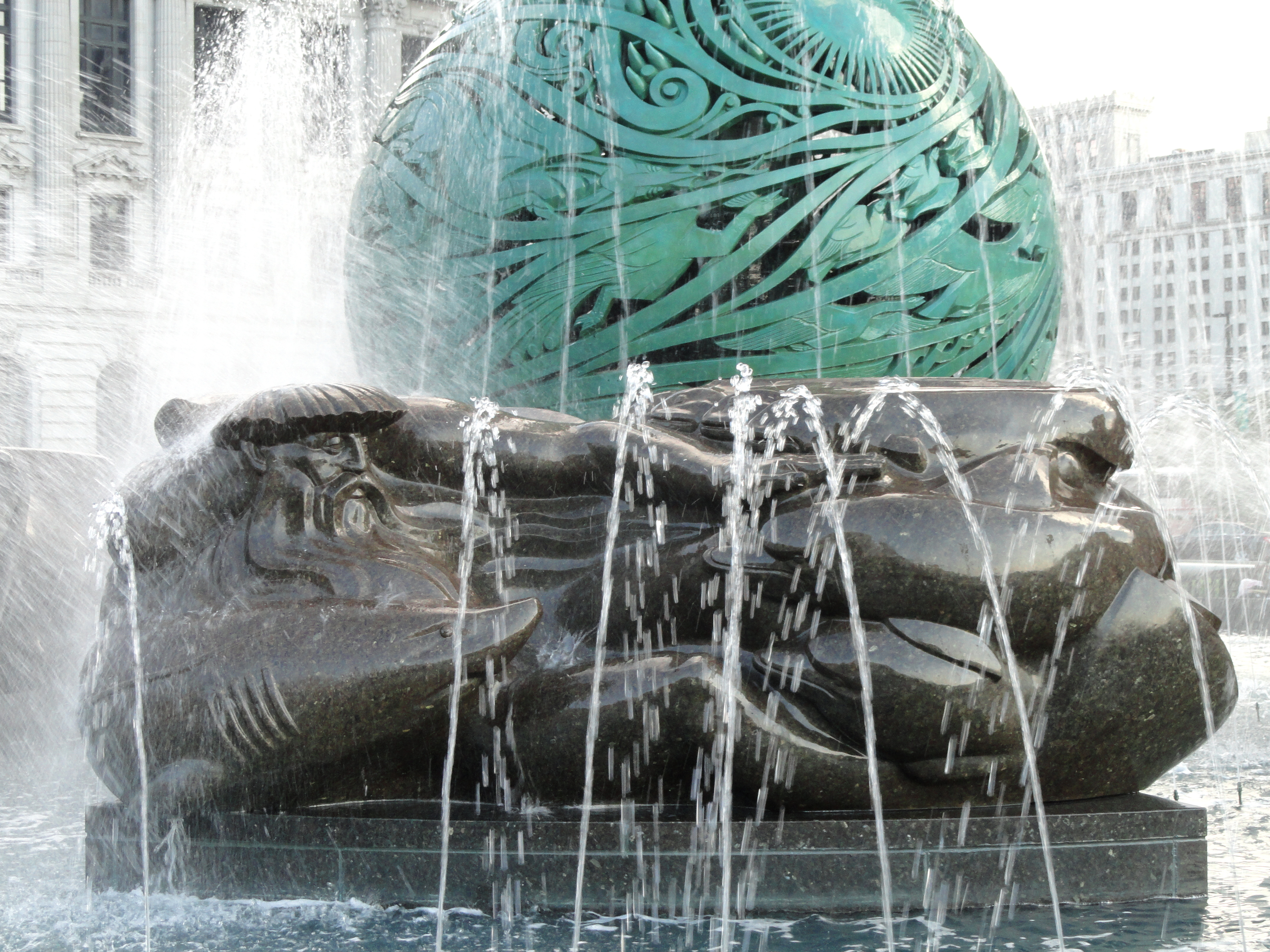
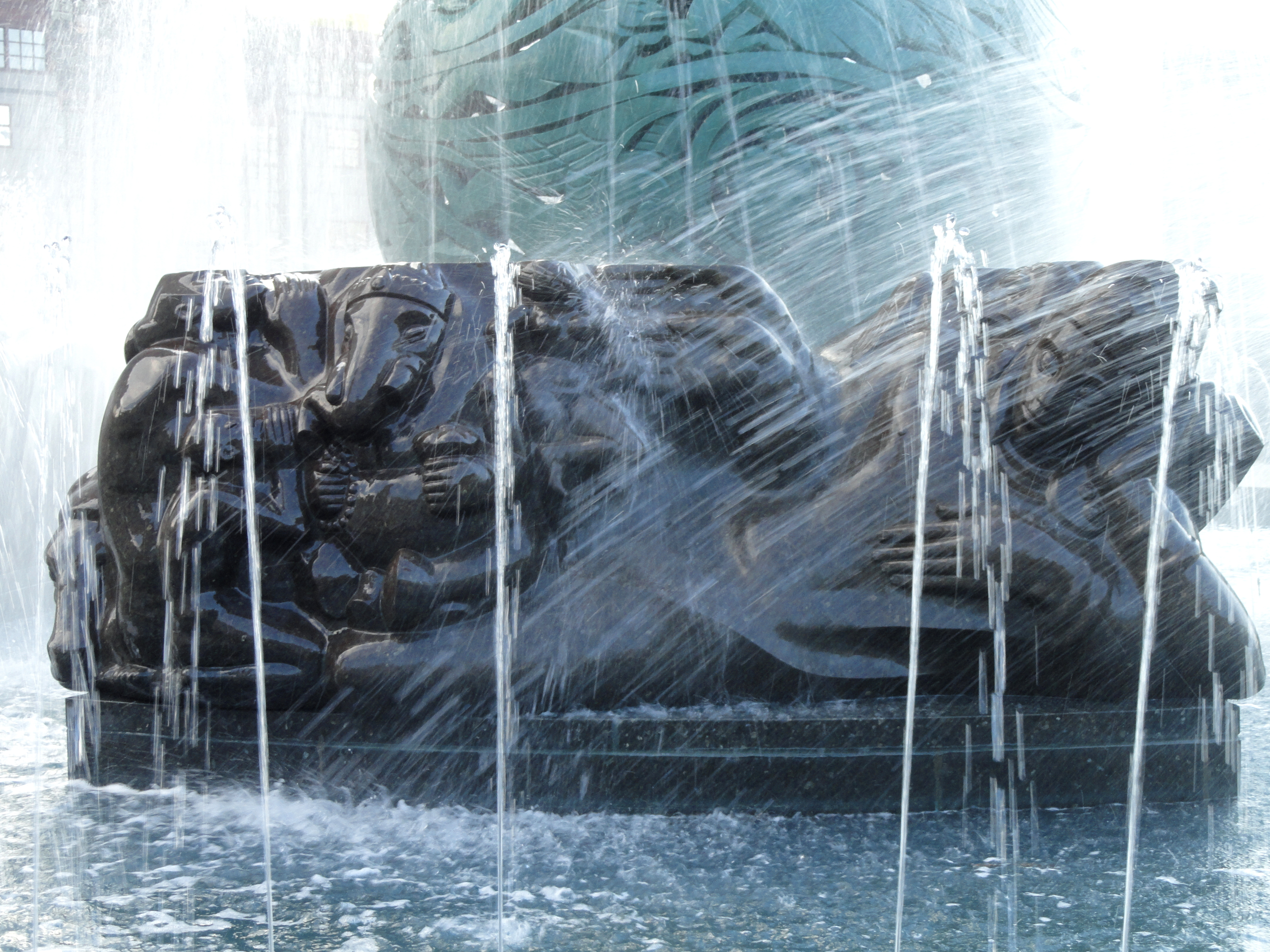
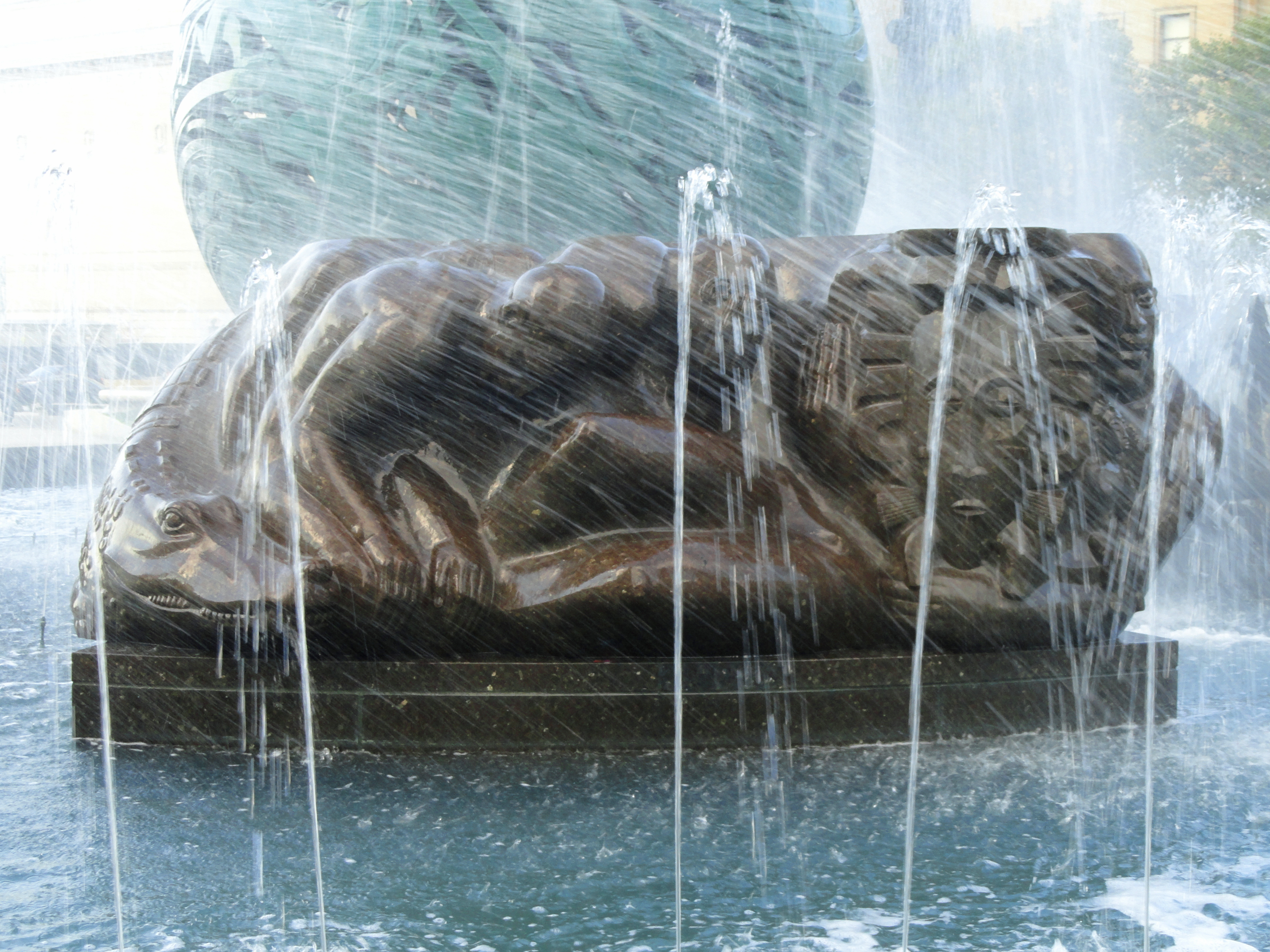
The four sculptures at the base of the fountain

The fountain was initiated and promoted by the Cleveland Press, which raised $250,000 in donations from private citizens and various organizations for the project. The centerpiece is a 35-foot (11 m) bronze figure representing man escaping from the flames of war and reaching skyward for eternal peace. The bronze sphere from which the figure rises represents Earth. Four granite carvings, representing the "geographic civilizations of the world", are placed around the sphere. Fredericks described his central figure, towering 46 feet (14 m) above the basin, in this way:

This Figure expresses the main theme of the Memorial Fountain, namely, the spirit of mankind rising out of the encircling flames of war, pestilence, and the destructive elements of life, reaching and ascending to a new understanding of life. Man rising above death, reaching upward to his God and toward Peace.

— Marshall Fredericks,

On the surface of the polished granite rim surrounding the fountain are bronze plates bearing the names of 5,552 Greater Clevelanders who have fallen in military service during times of war from 1899 to 2014, a span of 115 years. This includes soldiers from the Spanish–American War, World War I, World War II, the Korean War, the Vietnam War, the Gulf War, and the Iraq War. These names are memorialized in the Greater Cleveland Veterans Memorial Honor Roll.

== Dedications ==
At its initial dedication in 1964, there were 4,155 names on the existing Memorial Fountain. These names represented Americans who died during World War II and the Korean War. The memorial underwent a complete restoration during the construction of an underlying parking garage in connection with the neighboring Key Tower, and was rededicated on Veterans Day in 1991. At a 2004 rededication, the GCVM added 1,361 additional names to the Memorial Fountain to include those Greater Clevelanders who died in the Spanish–American War, World War I, the Vietnam War, and the initial six casualties of the Iraq War. This number also included those who perished during World War II and the Korean War for whom new information was found to support their addition to the Memorial Fountain. Another rededication on July 25, 2014 added 42 new memorial names – 33 representing the Iraq War, the remainder from the Vietnam War, the Korean War, and World War II.

== See also ==
- The Spirit of Detroit
