= Woodland Indian and Whistling Swans =

Bronze sculpture by Marshall Fredericks

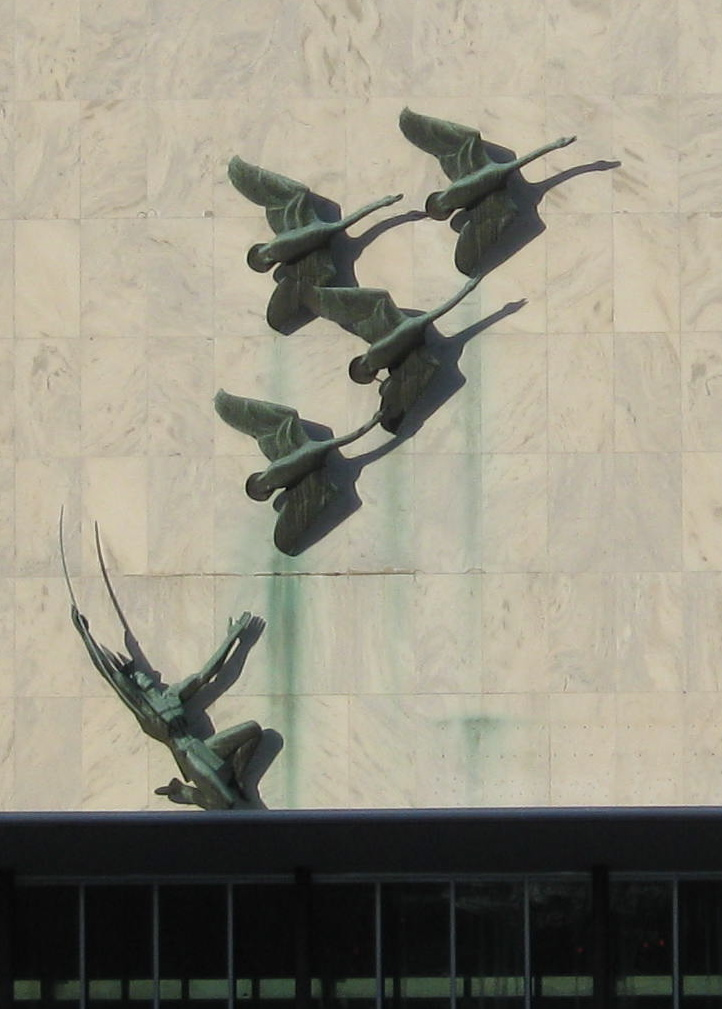
- Artist: Marshall Fredericks
- Year: 1963
- Type: Public Art, Sculpture
- Dimensions: 1,200 cm × 91 cm × 850 cm (480 in × 36 in × 336 in)
- Location: Milwaukee Public Museum, Milwaukee; 43°2′25.294″N 87°55′18.228″W
- Owner: Milwaukee County Department of Parks

Woodland Indian and Whistling Swans is a bronze sculpture created by American sculptor Marshall Fredericks in 1963. It is located at the Milwaukee Public Museum at 800 West Wells Street, Milwaukee, Wisconsin.

== Description ==
The Woodland Indian and Whistling Swans sculpture adorns the south façade of the Milwaukee Public Museum spanning 40 ft x 28 ft x 3 ft. The Native American Indian figure kneels with his arms outstretched, leading the viewers' eye to the prominent flock of four swans above. Architect Theodore Eschweiler (Eschweiler and Eschweiler) commissioned the artist, Marshall Fredericks, to design a sculpture for the museum's new building. The sculpture cost $50,000 and spans the building's facade from the second to fourth floors. A nearby plaque reads:

THE SCULPTURE ABOVE...
ALGONKIAN INDIAN AND WHISTLING SWANS
BY MARSHALL M. FREDERICKS
SYMBOLIZING FREEDOM AND BEAUTY
OF NATURE IN THE GREAT LAKES AREA.

== History ==
The Milwaukee Public Museum is one of the leading museums of human and natural history as well as the first museum to create full-sized dioramas. It originally shared a space with Milwaukee Public Library. In 1950 the architectural firm Eschweiler and Eschweiler proposed designs for a new building to house the museum. The building was built in the 1960s when Stephan Borhegyi, then museum director, led the effort to finish the project and incorporate advanced museum theories to the interior spaces. The building's architects commissioned Marshall Fredericks to create a sculpture for the museum's entrance facade. Woodland Indian and Whistling Swans symbolizes the Great Lakes area. "A Woodland Indian, ready to release an arrow from his bow, pauses in awe before the beauty of nature as seen in the flight of swans." Although Fredericks was paid $50,000 for the artwork, the mounting of the work was problematic because of the sculpture's weight and size. The city had to negotiate with contractors before the sculpture was finally installed.

The bronze sculpture has served the museum well. During the museum's centennial in 1983, the image was selected to be reproduced as the celebration logo. Today it continues to be the identifying image of the museum, accurately representing the focus of the museum on both human and natural history.

== Owner ==
It is administered by Milwaukee County, Department of Parks, Recreation and Culture.

== Condition ==
The work is well maintained, although there is some green patina.
