= Marshall Fredericks =

American sculptor (1908-1998)

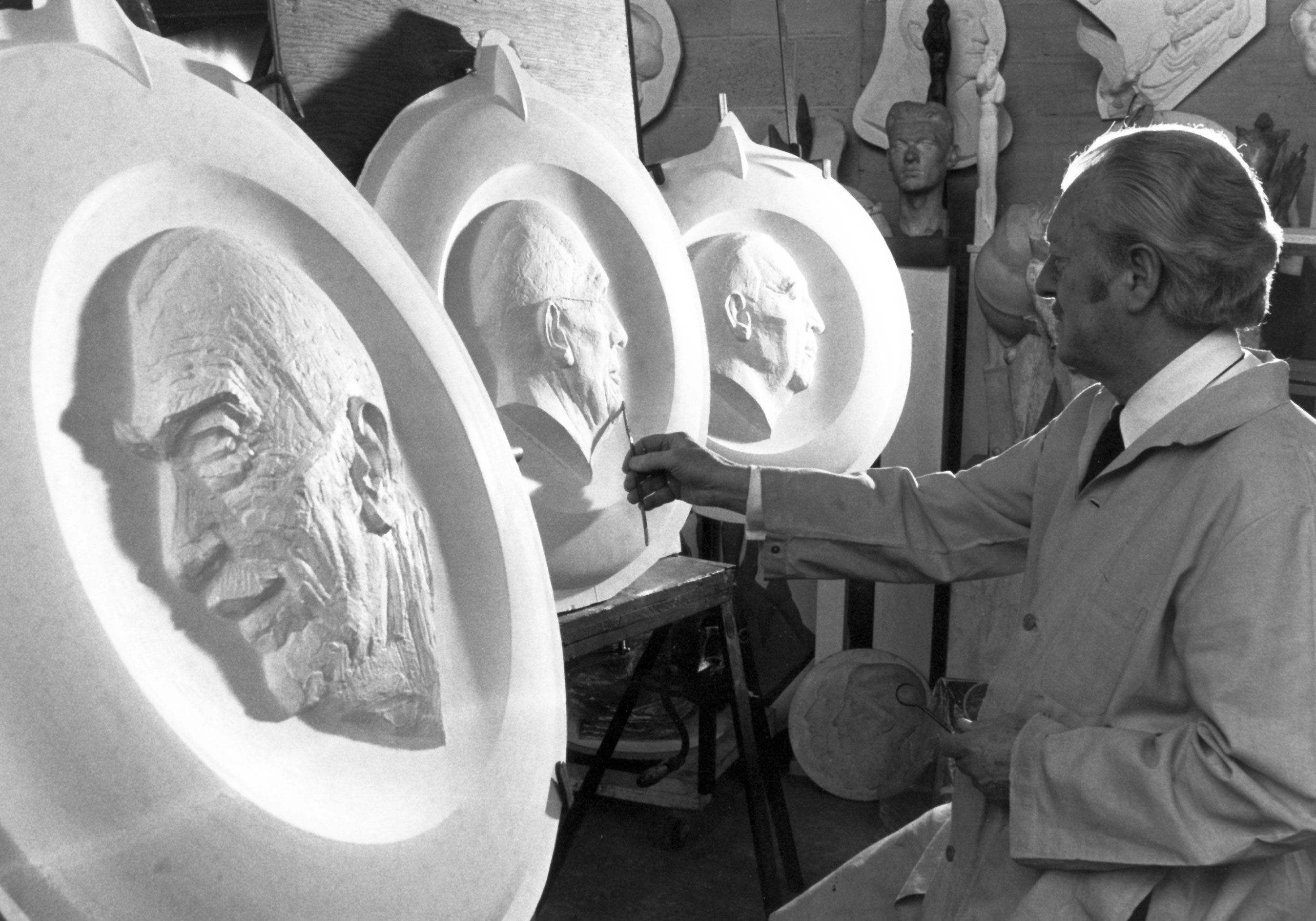
- Born: Marshall Maynard Fredericks; January 31, 1908; Rock Island, Illinois, U.S.
- Died: April 4, 1998 (aged 90); Birmingham, Michigan, U.S.
- Education: Cleveland School of Art
- Notable work: The Spirit of Detroit, Indian River Catholic Shrine, Fountain of Eternal Life
- Style: Art Deco
- Spouse: Rosalind Cooke
- Awards: National Sculpture Society Medal of Honor, American Institute of Architects Gold Fine Arts Medal, Architectural League of New York Gold Medal of Honor, Michigan Academy of Science, Arts, and Letters Gold Medal of Honor, National Sculpture Society Henry Hering Medal
- Memorials: Marshall M. Fredericks Sculpture Museum
- Website: marshallfredericks.org

Marshall Maynard Fredericks (January 31, 1908 – April 4, 1998) was an American sculptor known for such works as Fountain of Eternal Life, The Spirit of Detroit, Man and the Expanding Universe Fountain, and many others.

== Early life and education ==
Fredericks was born of Scandinavian descent in Rock Island, Illinois, on January 31, 1908. His family moved to Florida for a short time and then settled in Cleveland, where he grew up. He graduated from the Cleveland School of Art in 1930 and journeyed abroad on a fellowship to study with Carl Milles (1875–1955) in Sweden. After some months he studied in other academies and private studios in Denmark, Germany, France, and Italy, and traveled extensively in Europe and North Africa.

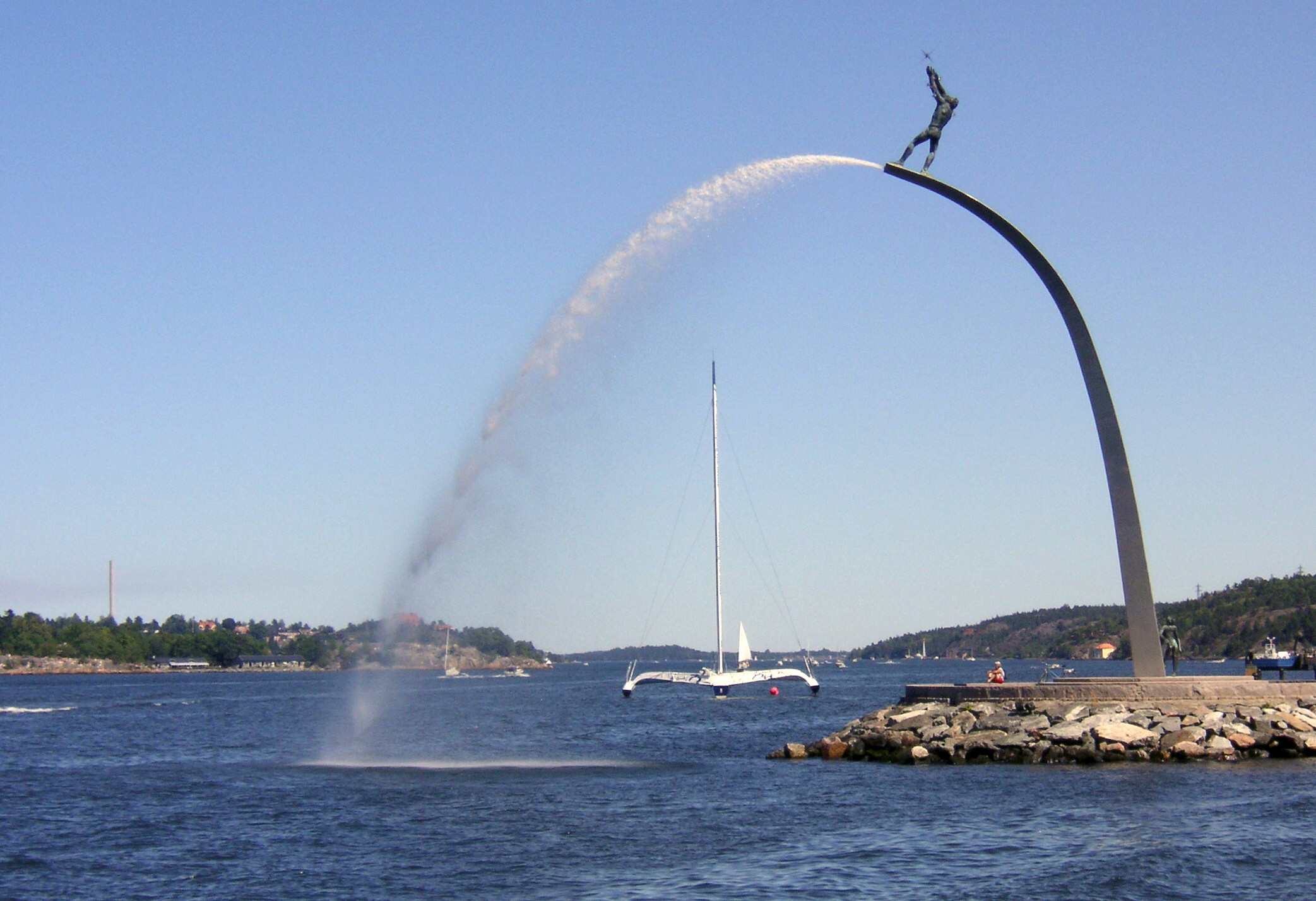
Carl Milles and Marshall M. Fredericks Lord placing new stars on heaven, Nacka Strand, Sweden.

In 1932, Milles invited him to join the staffs of Cranbrook Academy of Art and Cranbrook and Kingswood School in Bloomfield Hills, Michigan, where he taught until he enlisted in the armed forces in 1942. In 1945, Fredericks was honorably discharged from the Air Force as a lieutenant colonel.

== Career ==
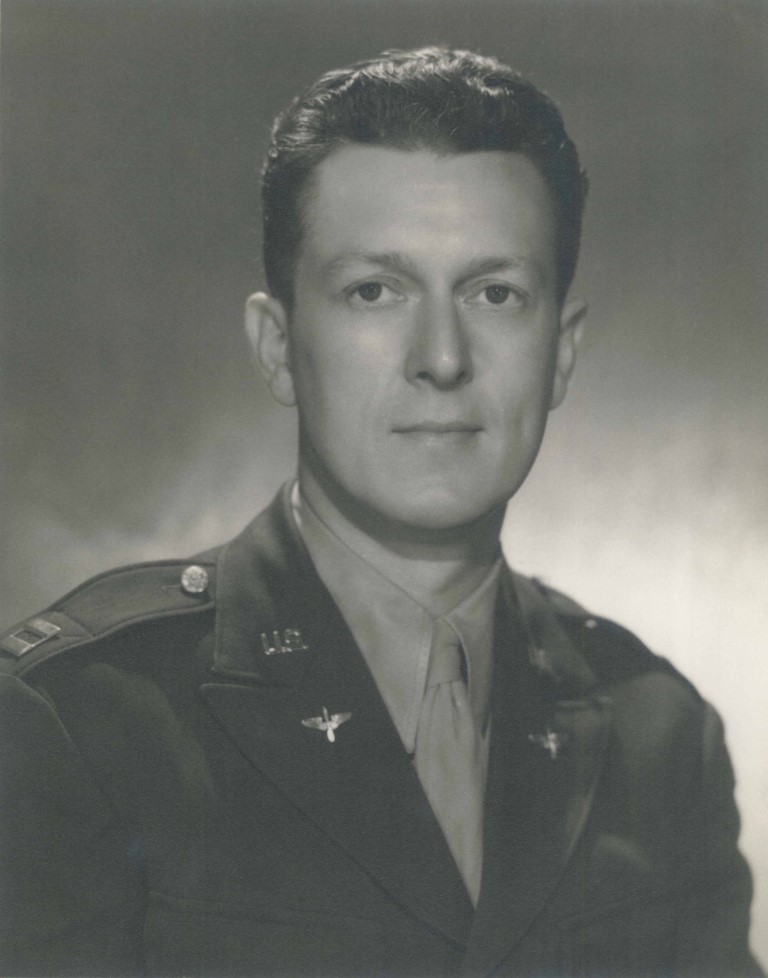
Fredericks during his service in the military

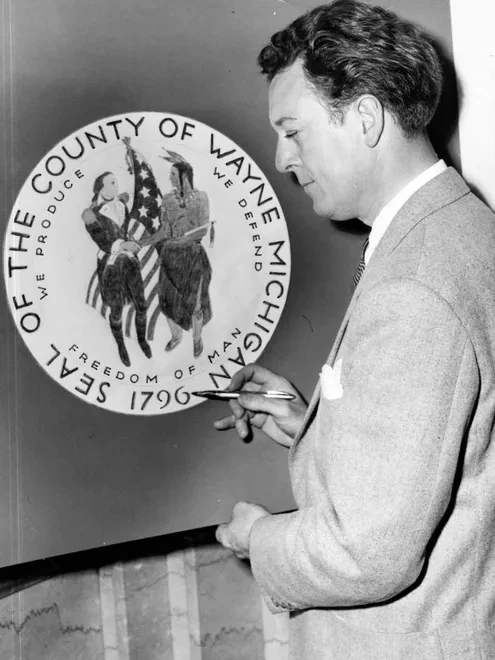
Fredericks in the 1950s, designing the seal of Wayne County, Michigan

In 1936, Fredericks won a competition to create the Levi L. Barbour Memorial Fountain on Belle Isle in Detroit. This was to be the first of many public monuments created by Fredericks. After World War II, the sculptor worked continuously on his numerous commissions for fountains, memorials, free-standing sculptures, reliefs, and portraits in bronze and other materials. Many of his works have spiritual intensity, lighthearted humor and a warm and gentle humanist spirit like that found in Fredericks himself.

Fredericks was the recipient of many U.S. and foreign awards and decorations for his artistic and humanitarian achievements. He exhibited his work nationally and internationally and many of his works are in national, civic, and private collections.

In 1955, Fredericks created the Wayne County seal, which is still used today and is also featured on the county's flag. He designed the seal while making the Spirit of Detroit statue, as a seal was part of the work and the county did not have a seal at the time.

In 1957, Fredericks was elected into the National Academy of Design as an Associate member, and became a full Academician in 1961.

=== Major works ===
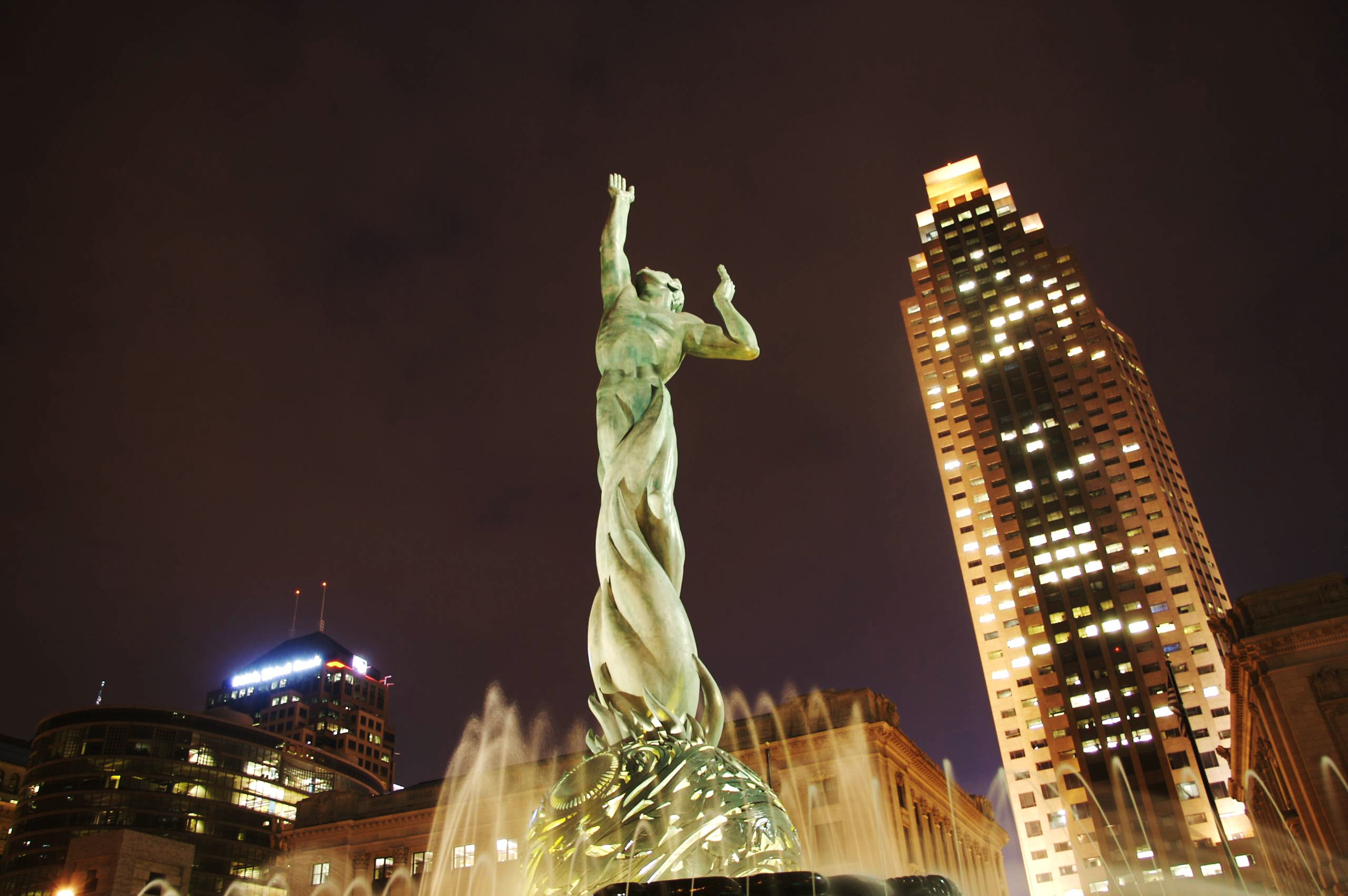
The Fountain of Eternal Life by Marshall Fredericks.

==== Cleveland War Memorial Fountain: Peace Arising from the Flames of War ====
The Cleveland War Memorial Fountain: Peace Arising from the Flames of War, also known as the Fountain of Eternal Life, was installed on The Mall in Downtown Cleveland to commemorate those who served in World War II. It bears the inscription, "IN HONORED MEMORY OF THOSE WHO GAVE THEIR LIVES FOR THEIR COUNTRY". The work was 20 years in the making and was dedicated on May 31, 1964.

Four groups in Norwegian emerald pearl granite, each 4 by 12 feet (1.2 by 3.7 m), represent the religious aspirations from all over the globe that are the foundation for the soaring figure that represents eternal life. The figure was cast in Norway, where also the granite groups were carved. The globe under the figure was cast in Brooklyn, New York. The four groups represent the four "corners" of the Earth from which come the major religions, which in turn gave birth to the idea of eternal life, here represented by the human figure in the center of the sculpture.

==== Boy and Bear ====
Fredericks was one of six artists commissioned to design sculpture for Northland Shopping Center in Southfield, Michigan. When it opened in 1954, Northland was the country's largest shopping center as well as the first regional shopping center. The architects planned for sculpture to play an important role in the shopping center's courts and malls. Fredericks designed this sculpture with children in mind. As with his other large animal sculptures, he gave the bear a benevolent quality so it would not frighten children. This bear could be a child's best friend. The contrast of the massive body of the bear with the almost frail body of the boy on his back emphasizes this special relationship. The bear's head is down, communicating only amicable intentions. Its erect ears and furrowed brow suggest interest in a viewer at this low eye level. Fredericks' portrayal of the bear is not totally realistic, but like several of his animal sculptures, he portrayed the bear as in a child's imagination. The sculpture at Northland pleased children and adults alike from the day it was first installed until the center closed in 2015. In 2016, the city of Southfield purchased the center and moved the sculpture to the lobby of the Southfield Public Library.

Despite similarities between this sculpture and the characters in Walt Disney's 1967 film The Jungle Book, Fredericks disavowed any influence from Disney, The Jungle Book, originally published in 1894, or its author, Rudyard Kipling. Fredericks said that he simply wanted to make a sculpture of a boy and bear because it would be fun. On display at the Fredricks Sculpture Gallery is an earlier version of this sculpture in bronze. A similar casting is on display in the children's room of the Grosse Pointe Public Library and at the Frederik Meijer Gardens and Sculpture Park in Grand Rapids.

==== Christ on the Cross ====
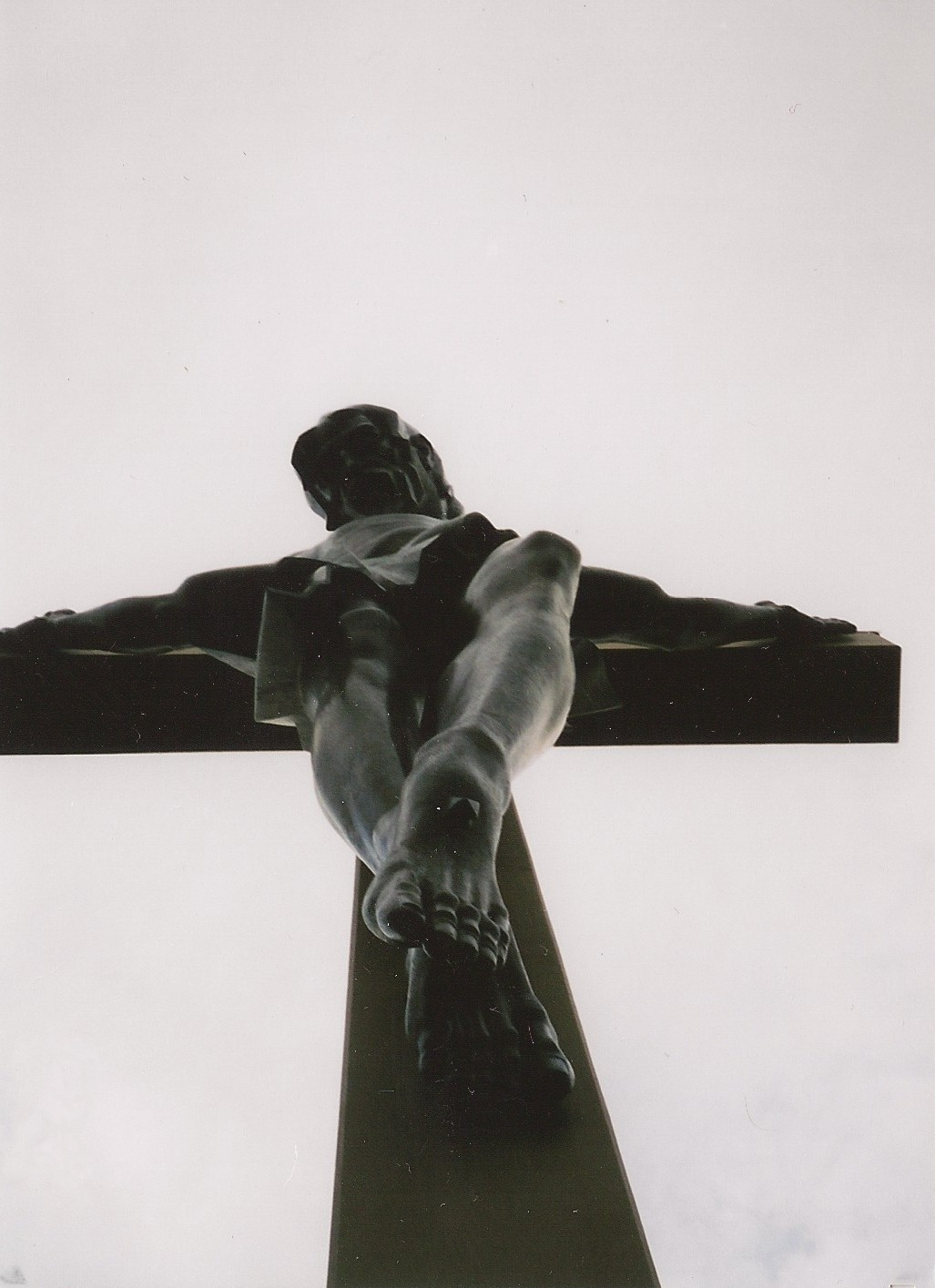
Christ on the Cross, completed in 1959

Fredericks was commissioned to sculpt a 6-foot-tall (1.8 m) crucifix, but instead designed this 28-foot (8.5 m), full-scale model, for a bronze to be placed at the Indian River Catholic Shrine in Indian River, Michigan. The bronze Corpus is mounted on a 55-foot-tall (17 m) redwood cross. When erected in 1959, it was believed to be the largest crucifix in the world. Since then, a 65-foot (20 m) crucifix was erected in the cemetery of St. Thomas Catholic Church hear Bardstown, Kentucky, however the Corpus on this work is only 14 feet (4.3 m) in height.

The Indian River figure required only three years to complete, however the plaster model on which it was based required seven-years of restoration before being put on permanent display at the Fredricks Sculpture Museum. It suffered from neglect during the two-decades it was in storage at the foundry in Scandinavia after the bronze was cast. In his depiction Fredericks chose not to depict the pain and suffering of Jesus and omitted the crown of thorns and the wound in the figure's side. Instead, he shows the powerful body of Jesus at peace in the moment after death.

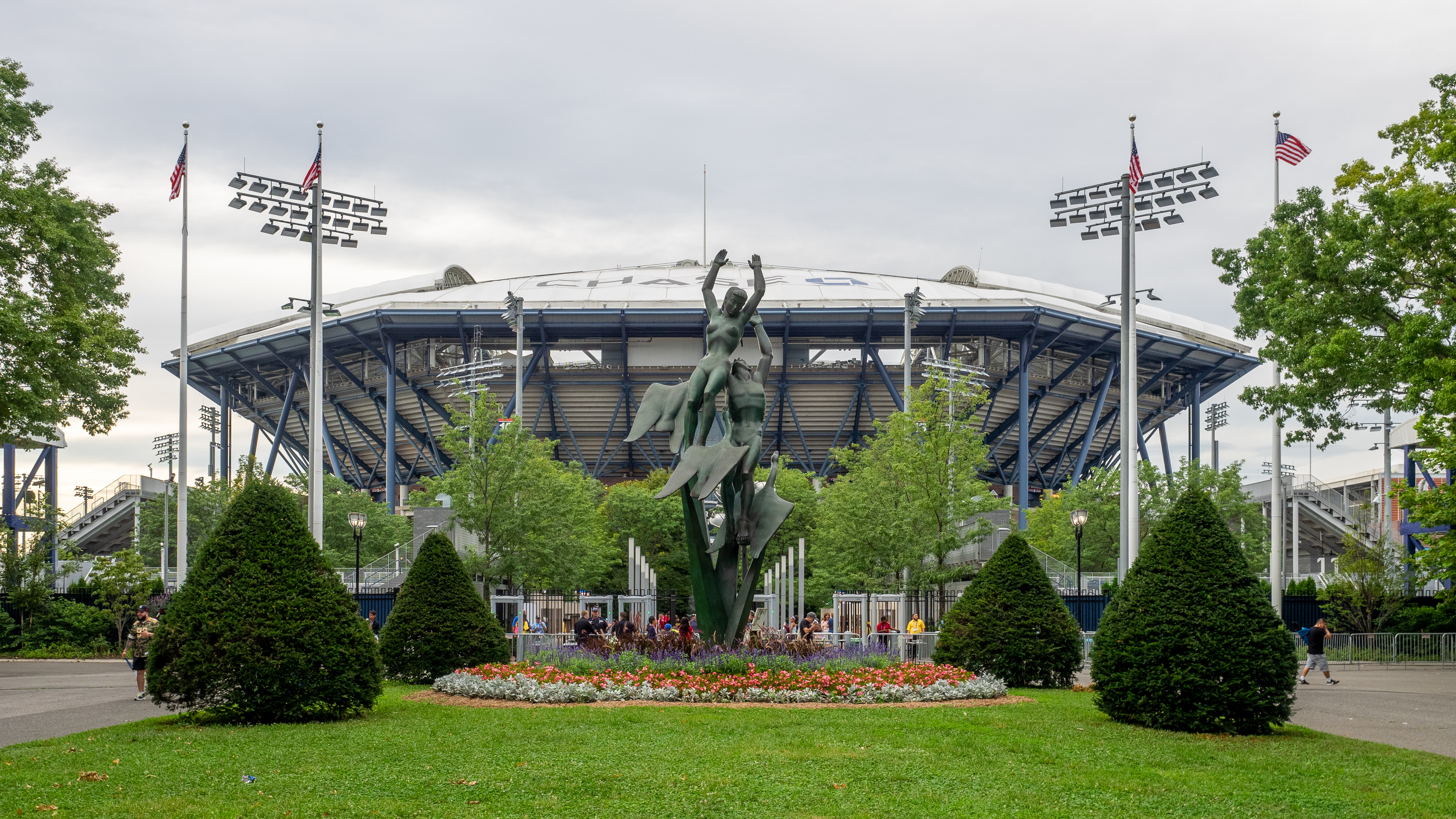
Freedom of the Human Spirit

==== Freedom of the Human Spirit ====
The Freedom of the Human Spirit was originally sculpted for the 1964 World's Fair in New York City and stood in the Court of States.

Fredericks is quoted explaining the Freedom of the Human Spirit:

"I tried to take the male and female figures and free them from the earth. The only reason they stand up in the space at all is because they are suspended by sort of semi-visible abstract forms that keep them in the air, and then there are three giant wind swans flying with them. The idea was that these human beings, these people -- us, do not have to be limited to the earth, to the ground. We can free ourselves mentally and spiritually whenever we want to, if we just try to do so."

This sculpture was moved in 1996 to the plaza adjacent to Arthur Ashe Stadium at the USTA Billie Jean King National Tennis Center in New York City. In 1983, Fredericks donated a casting of the work to his adopted home of Birmingham, Michigan for that city's fiftieth anniversary. It occupies a site in the city's Shain Park.

==== Leaping Gazelle ====
This sculpture was the first commissioned work for which Marshall Fredericks was paid. In 1936, the sculpture won first prize in a national competition, and as a result, Fredericks became well known as a public sculptor. Since the gazelle is not native to Michigan, Fredericks made four animals that are, and placed them around the gazelle on Belle Isle. These animals are the otter, grouse, hawk, and rabbit. Fredericks sculpted the gazelle in a characteristic movement called wheeling, which is when an animal quickly changes direction while being pursued by a predator.

Leaping Gazelle is one of the most duplicated of Fredericks's sculptures. It can be found at numerous locations, including Brookgreen Gardens in South Carolina where it was one of four Purchase prize winners of a nationwide open sculpture competition in 1972.

==== Lion and Mouse ====
Fredericks said this sculpture illustrates Aesop's Fable of "The Lion and the Mouse". In the story, a lion caught a mouse. As the lion was about to eat him, the mouse pleaded for mercy, promising to help the lion one day. The lion was so amused by the prospect of a tiny mouse helping the king of the jungle that he freed the mouse. Some time later, the mouse came across the lion trapped in a hunter's net and gnawed through the ropes to free him. In a different version of the story, the mouse extracted from the lion's paw a troublesome thorn too tiny for the massive lion's claws to grasp. A fitting moral to the story is that kindness is seldom thrown away, be it given to the mightiest or lowliest of creatures. Fredericks captured the story in a single image by contrasting the tiny mouse with the much larger lion.

The J. L. Hudson Company commissioned this sculpture for Eastland Center in Harper Woods, Michigan, in 1957. Like many of Fredericks' sculptures, he designed it specifically for children. Both animals are humanized with friendly facial expressions. The lion's reclining position and his crossed legs are very human-like, yet his huge round head is stylized with uniformly coiled ringlets and his knees are abstracted. These alterations of nature make the king of the jungle non-threatening to children and adults alike.

==== The Poet, Lord Byron ====
When Fredericks was a teenager his inspiration was Lord Byron, the nineteenth-century Romantic poet who became associated with a haughty, melancholy mood. Fredericks presents Lord Byron in a dramatic pose with his head thrown back and hand raised to his forehead. He seems to suffer inner turmoil suggestive of the melancholic life of the poet. Lord Byron's left leg was slightly shorter than his right and he was sensitive about his lameness. Fredericks captured this aspect of Byron's personality by posing him draped in a long cape which partially conceals his legs. The Bronze full-scale sculpture resides on the campus of Saginaw Valley State University and was cast in 1999.

==== Man and the Expanding Universe Fountain ====
The Man and the Expanding Universe Fountain was installed in the South Court of the United States Department of State Headquarters Building in Washington, D.C., in 1964.

The fountain was erected to celebrate the nation's first exploration of outer space. The monumental central figure suggests a superhuman mythological being. He is seated upon a 10-foot (3.0 m) sphere, encrusted with a multitude of stars of various magnitudes set in a pattern of the bright-star constellations of the celestial system. In his hands, he holds two planets that he is sending off into space. His hair, designed with jagged lightning-like forms, is studded with clusters of multi-pointed stars. The dynamic spiral orbit-form swirling around the sphere represents the speed and perpetual movement of the heavenly bodies in space. Play of the water in a spiral pattern from numerous star-shaped sprays is intended to increase the feeling of movement upon the figure, sphere, and orbit.

The basin of the fountain is lined with colored glass mosaic tiles. The central figure and sphere are cast in bronze while the orbit, planets, water spouts, and the stars in the hair and on the surface of the sphere are of nickel alloy. According to Fredericks, the sculpture "represents this age of great interest, exploration and discovery in outer space...[and] the immensity, order and mystery of the universe."

==== Night and Day Fountain ====
The fountain was commissioned for the Henry G. McMorran Auditorium in Port Huron, Michigan. Fredericks also created a gold anodized aluminum Sculptured Clock on the building that was completed in 1957, two years before the fountain's installation. The sculptures and clock were conceived as a unified design.

In keeping with a long tradition in western art, the sculptor personified time with figures representing night and day. Night has long, smooth, graceful curves that are repeated in the lines of the swan in flight beneath her. In comparison, Day is more angular and his muscles are more pronounced, as are the veins in the arms and hands. Day rests upon an otter, hunting among a school of Northern pike and Night floats upon a swan in flight, holding a small bird in her hand.

The Night and Day Fountain can also be seen at the Fredricks Sculpture Gallery.

==== The Spirit of Detroit ====
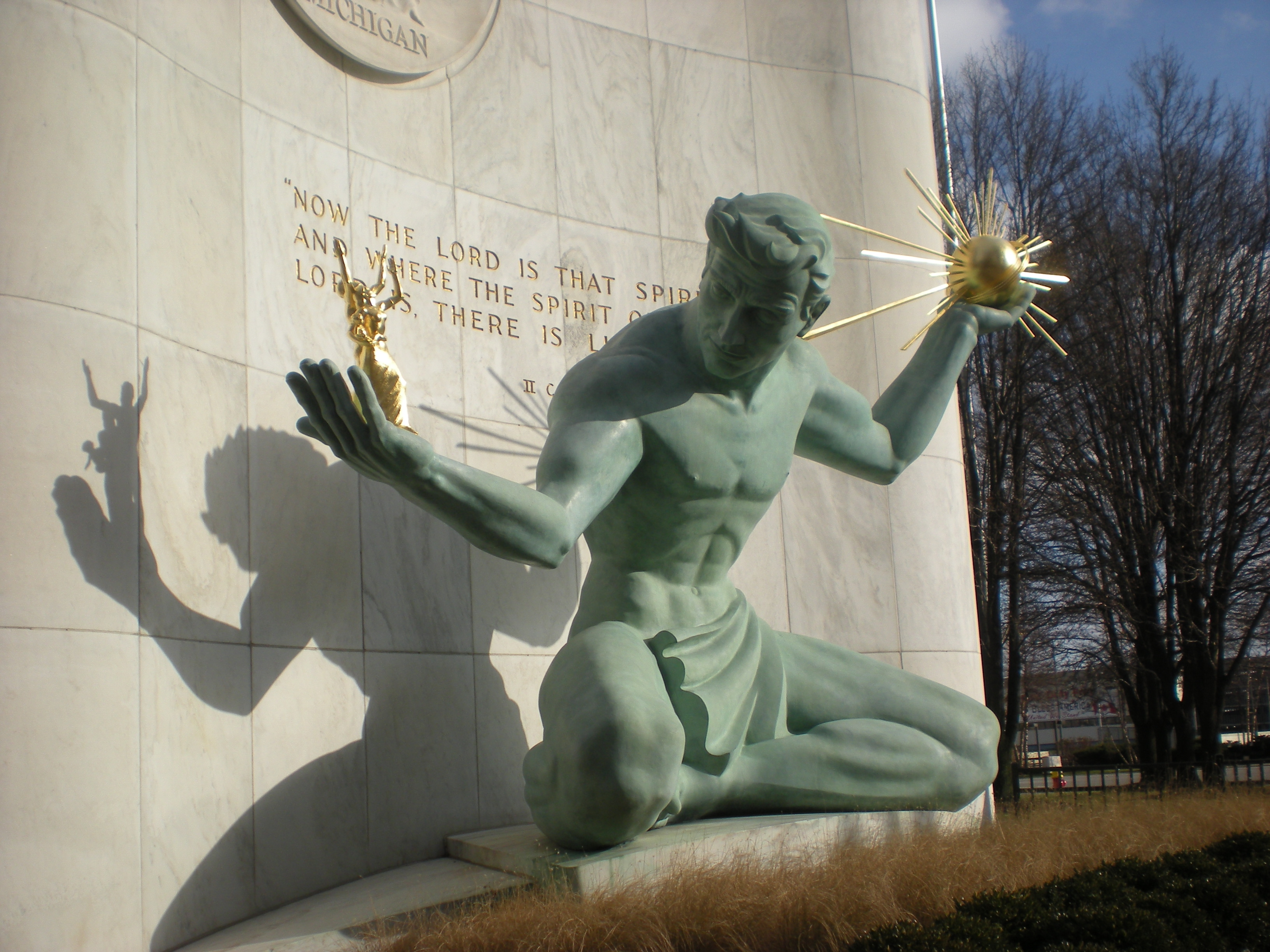
The Spirit of Detroit by Marshall Fredericks.

Working from a small model, Fredericks made the full-scale model for the 16-foot-tall (4.9 m) figure at the entrance to the Coleman A. Young Municipal Center in Detroit. For monumental sculpture, sculptors typically create a small model or maquette, then progressively larger models. This provides an opportunity to work out compositional details prior to construction of the large, expensive, and time-consuming full-scale model. Enlargement of the model is done with a point-up or pantograph machine. Three of the smaller models are on display in the Sculptor's Studio.

Fredericks stated that he never named the piece. He said: "The theme was a verse from the Bible (2 Corinthians 3:17); 'Now the Lord is that Spirit, and where the Spirit of the Lord is, there is liberty.' I tried to express the spirit of man through the deity and the family,"

After it was installed in 1958, it became popularly known as The Spirit of Detroit. Not only did Fredericks waive his creative fee for this sculpture, but it actually cost him money to produce. However he believed this was merely part of his civic responsibility.

In 2013, art dealer and art historian Eric Ian Hornak Spoutz was quoted in The Detroit News stating that the value of the statue is in excess of $1,000,000.

==== The Thinker ====
Fredericks created this sculpture after George Gough Booth, the founder of Cranbrook Educational Community, asked him to make a "Thinker" for the steps of the Cranbrook Art Museum similar to Auguste Rodin's renowned The Thinker, a cast of which is at the entrance of the Detroit Institute of Arts. The pose Fredericks' Thinker assumes is a direct reference to Rodin's sculpture; however, Fredericks' replacement of Rodin's heroic male nude with a bemused chimpanzee is a thought provoking variation on the earlier statue and reveals his fondness for primates. Fredericks indicated that when Booth saw the compact composition of the chimp stroking his chin, he commented that it was not like Rodin would have done, but Booth was sure the chimp was thinking much more interesting thoughts than most of us.

==== Two Bears ====
Two Bears was originally created in 1962 for Lincoln Square, Urbana, Illinois. A large and small bear sit back-to-back in quiet contemplation. In nature, these two animals are enemies, however, Fredericks portrays the two in a gentle humanistic way, stressing tolerance. The bears are markedly different in their ears and noses and the small bear displays Fredericks' trademark teardrop-kneecap sculpting style. The sculpture also was seen at Stratford Square Mall in Bloomingdale, Illinois in the early 1980s until the late 1990s; it is unclear if the sculpture was donated by Lincoln Square or was commissioned again. Other sculptures that display this characteristic are The Thinker, Lion and Mouse, and the Male Baboon and Female Baboon sculptures.

=== Other selected works ===
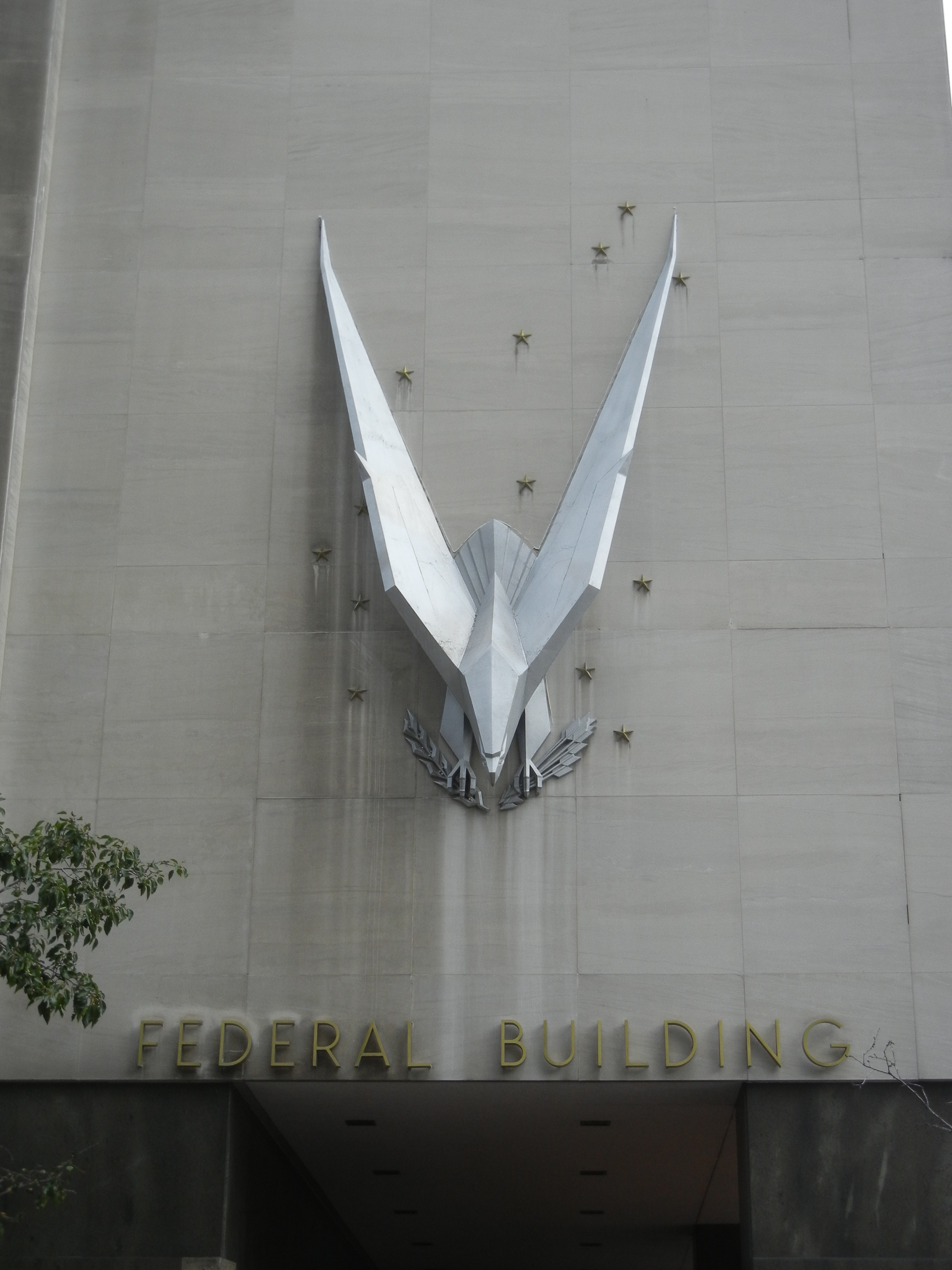
American Eagle in Cincinnati

- Ugly Duckling fountain
- Levi L Barbour Memorial Fountain, Belle Isle Park, Detroit, 1936
- Harlequins, Ballerina and Orchestral Parade, and The Ford Empire, Ford Auditorium, Detroit, 1955-56
- Flying Pterodactyls, at the Detroit Zoo, Royal Oak, Michigan, 1961
- Woodland Indian and Whistling Swans, Milwaukee Public Museum, 1963
- Fountain of Eternal Life, Cleveland, 1964

==== Architectural sculpture ====
- Horace H. Rackham Education Memorial Building, Detroit, 1942
- Victory Eagle and History Pylons at the UAW-Ford National Programs Center, Detroit, 1948
- American Eagle, John Weld Peck Federal Building, Cincinnati, 1964
- Star Dream Fountain, Centennial Commons Park, Royal Oak, MI

== Personal life ==
Fredericks resided in Birmingham, Michigan, with his wife Rosalind Cooke until his death April 4, 1998. The couple had five children and eight grandchildren. He maintained studios at 32001 Woodward Avenue in Royal Oak and on East Long Lake Road in Bloomfield Hills until his death. His estate donated the contents of both studios to the Marshall M. Fredericks Sculpture Museum on the campus of Saginaw Valley State University in Saginaw, Michigan.

== See also ==
- Category:Sculptures by Marshall Fredericks
- Art Deco
- Harvey Littleton (glass sculptor; student of Milles)
- Carl Milles
- Frank Murphy
