= Hilton Cleveland Downtown Hotel =

Hotel in Cleveland, Ohio

Coordinates: 41°30′10″N 81°41′45″W

Hilton Cleveland Downtown Hotel (HCDH)
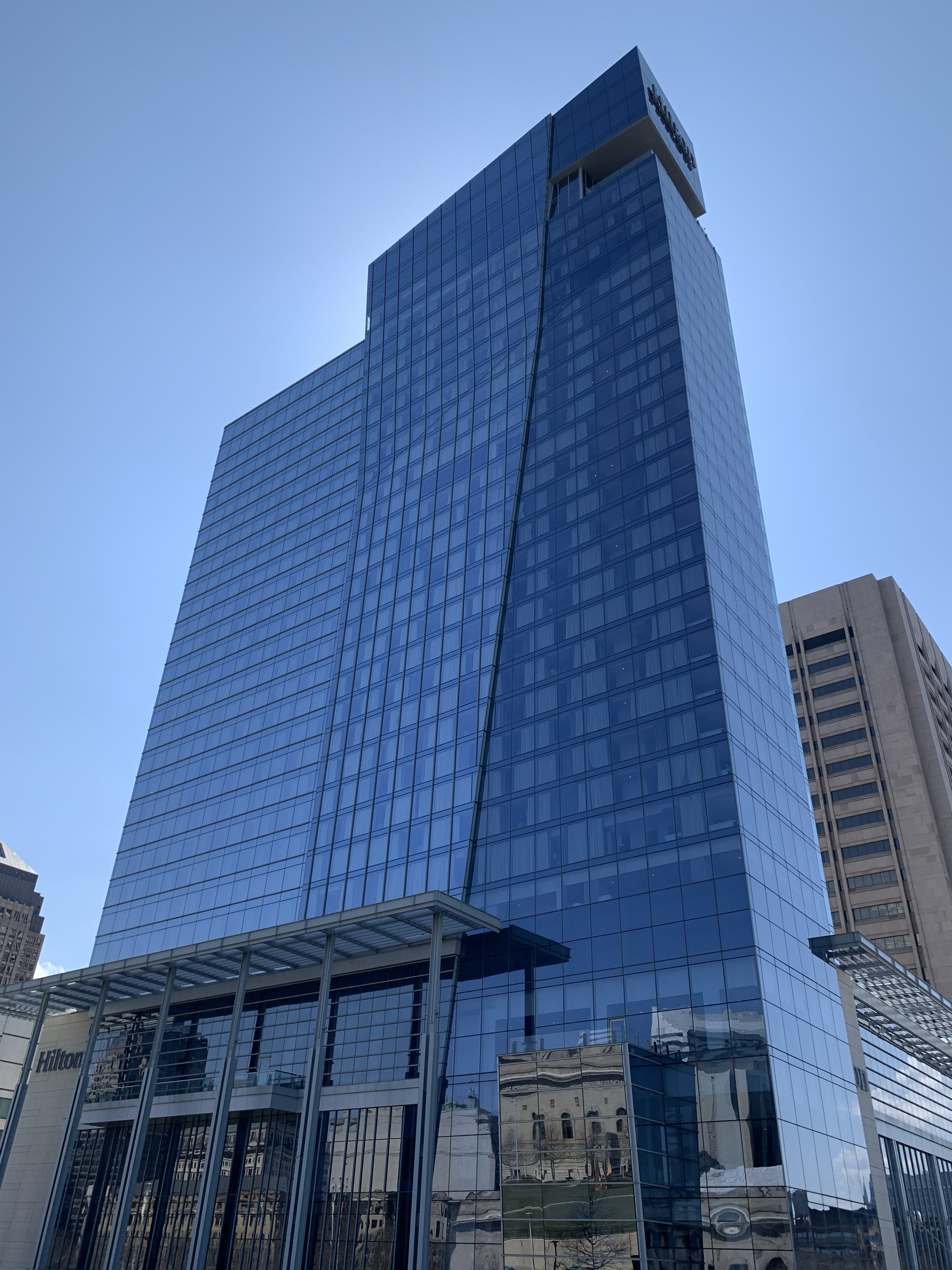
- Former names: Convention Center Hotel
- Hotel chain: Hilton Hotels & Resorts

General information
- Type: Hotel
- Location: 100 Lakeside Avenue Cleveland, Ohio 44114 United States
- Construction started: 2014
- Completed: 2016
- Cost: $272 Million

Height
- Roof: 114 m (374 ft)

Technical details
- Floor count: 32

Design and construction
- Architect: Cooper Carry
- Structural engineer: Barber & Hoffman, Inc.

Other information
- Number of rooms: 600

The Hilton Cleveland Downtown Hotel (HCDH) is a skyscraper on the corner of Ontario Street and Lakeside Avenue along The Mall in downtown Cleveland, Ohio, United States. It opened in 2016, has 600 rooms and is 32 stories high. It is one of three Hilton properties in downtown Cleveland, the other two being Hilton Garden Inn, and Hampton Inn.

The building was constructed under a partnership between the city of Cleveland and Cuyahoga County to attract larger conventions to the city of Cleveland. The agreement was entered into under the first chief executive of Cuyahoga County, Ed FitzGerald's administration and the Cleveland mayor Frank G. Jackson.

The hotel is the tallest and largest in the city. Previously, the largest hotel in the city was the Renaissance Cleveland Hotel which has 500 rooms. This is the first major hotel constructed in the city since the building of the Marriott at Key Center in 1991 at a height of 320 feet with 385 rooms. The new Hilton is managed by Tammy LeBlanc.

== Impetus for hotel ==
Following the completion of the new Global Center for Health Innovation and spurred by a tax over run that was raised by the county to construct that facility, the first chief executive of Cuyahoga County, Ed FitzGerald proposed the county mount a hotel project to meet demand for conventions that would otherwise overlook Cleveland which had no hotel to accommodate over 500 guests at a time since the 1990s when the Stouffer Hotels & Resorts company renovated its 1000-room Hotel Cleveland at Public Square (connected to the Terminal Tower) down to 500 rooms. The Hilton Hotel project was considered instrumental in landing the 2016 Republican National Convention.

== Financing ==
The Hotel cost $272 million. The city of Cleveland passed legislation that led to the financing structure for the hotel in December 2013. Cuyahoga County followed suit by passing approval for the project in April 2014.

== Design ==
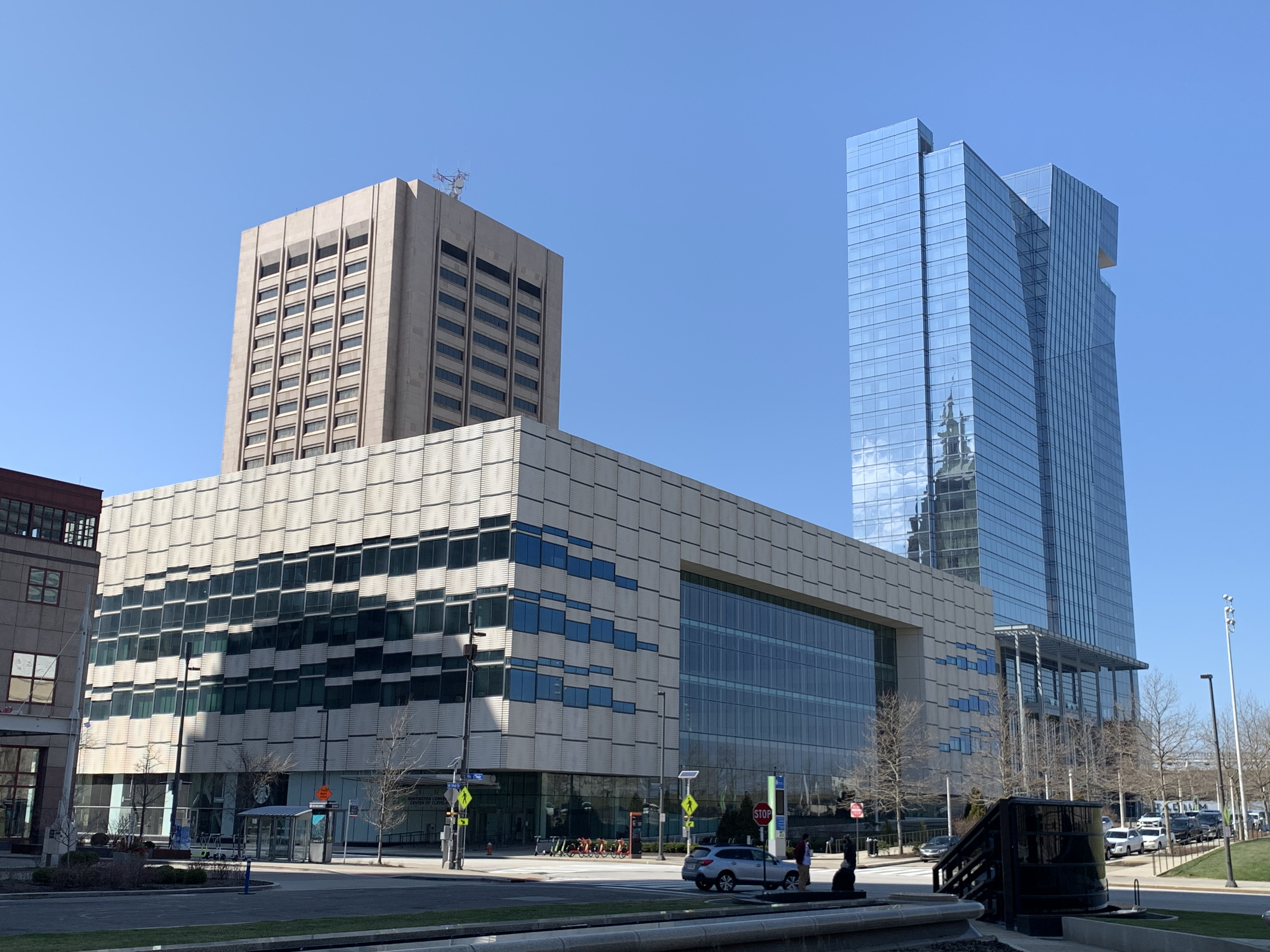

The lead architect on the project was the Atlanta firm of Cooper Carry. The project is LEED certified and uses glass extensively in three slender towers jutting up from a four-story concrete pedestal base. It contains two ballrooms. The hotel's bar is called the Burnham in honor of Daniel Burnham, whose Cleveland Group Plan was instituted in 1903. The skyscraper was erected by the New York City firm Turner Construction.

== See also ==
- List of tallest buildings in Cleveland
