= Global Center for Health Innovation =

Coordinates: 41°30′08″N 81°41′41″W

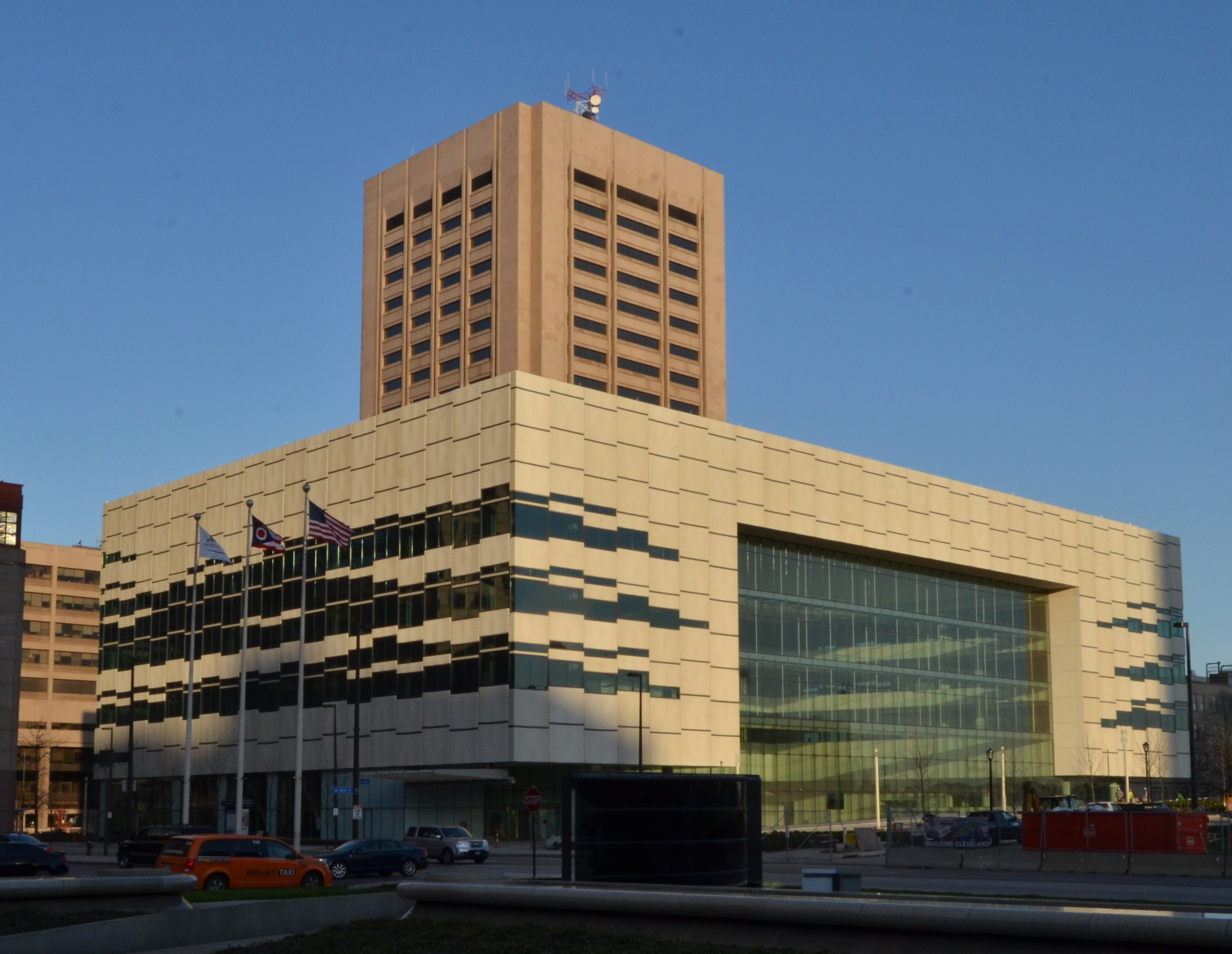
The building nearing completion in 2013

The Global Center for Health Innovation, also known as the Medical Mart, was a $465 million joint venture by Cuyahoga County and MMPI to construct a permanent showroom of medical, surgical and hospital goods along with a new Huntington Convention Center of Cleveland in downtown Cleveland, Ohio. Construction of the project on the historic Mall began May 2011 after being funded by a decades long 0.25% sales tax increase passed by Cuyahoga County commissioners in 2007. The Medical Mart concept is modeled after that of the Merchandise Mart in Chicago, and was initially managed by MMPI, the same company that operates the Merchandise Mart. SMG was scheduled to assume management of the Global Center on November 15, 2013. The Global Center closed in 2020 and remained vacant except for space temporarily leased on the 4th floor to accommodate socially distanced Cuyahoga County Common Pleas Court jury trials during the pandemic. In September 2022, the Cuyahoga County Council approved a $40.4 million renovation to turn the Global Center for Health Innovation into an extension of the Huntington Convention Center of Cleveland.

The center is attached to the Hilton Cleveland Downtown Hotel.
