= Marshall M. Fredericks Sculpture Museum =

Art museum in University Center, Michigan, U.S.

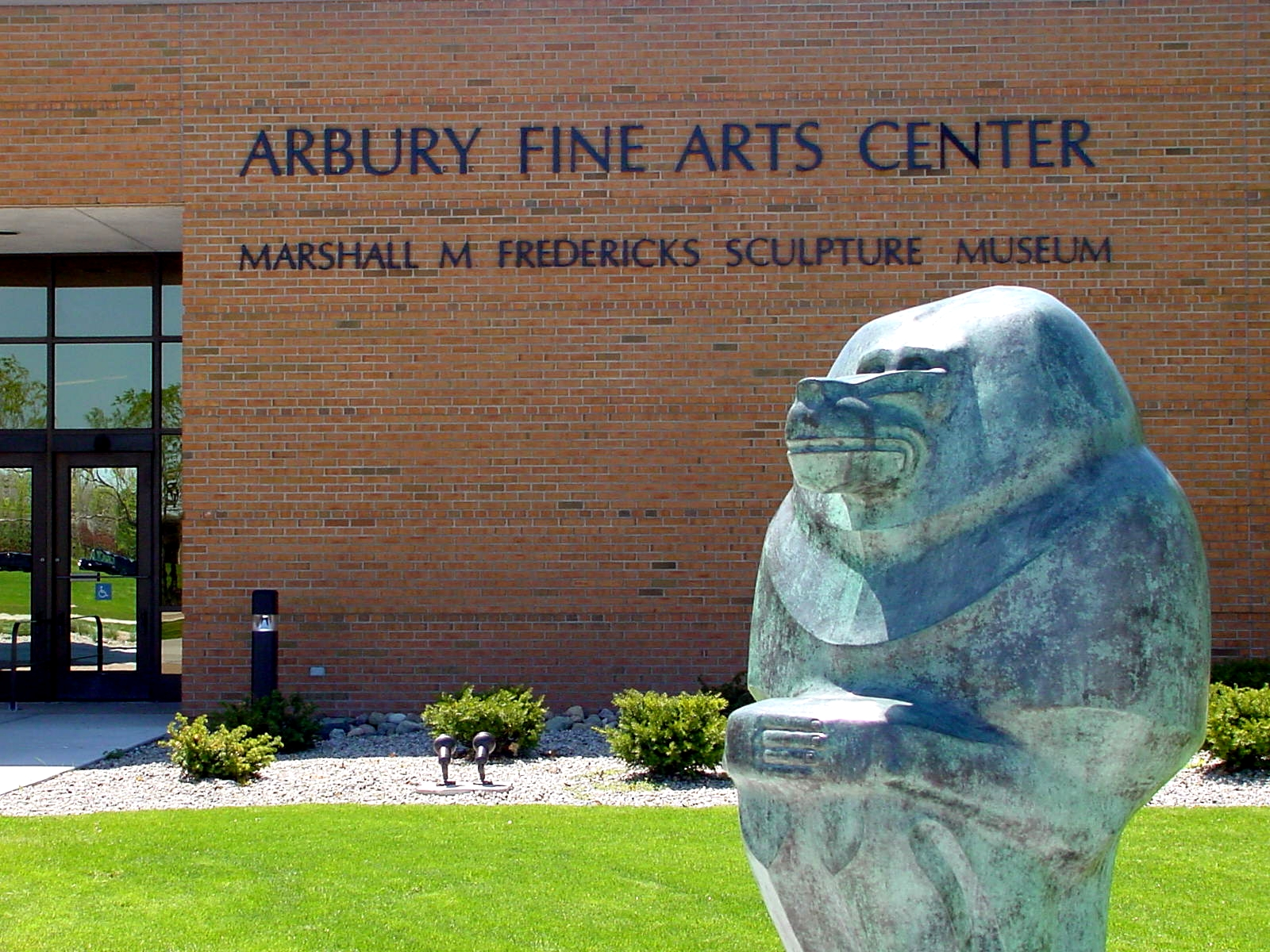
- Saginaw Valley State University's Marshall Fredericks Sculpture Museum in front of the Arbury Fine Arts Center
- Interactive fullscreen map
- Established: May 15, 1988 as the Marshall M. Fredericks Sculpture Gallery
- Location: Arbury Fine Arts Center, Saginaw Valley State University, University Center, Michigan, U.S.
- Coordinates: 43°30′52″N 83°57′49″W
- Accreditation: American Alliance of Museums
- Collection size: 200 in main gallery
- Director: Megan McAdow
- Website: marshallfredericks.org

The Marshall M. Fredericks Sculpture Museum is an art museum that focuses on the life and works of sculptor Marshall Fredericks. The museum is affiliated with Saginaw Valley State University, and is located in university's Arbury Fine Arts Center in University Center, Michigan, United States. Admission is free.

== History ==
Mrs. Dorothy (Honey) Arbury of Midland, Michigan studied with sculptor Marshall Fredericks when she attended Kingswood School at the Cranbrook Educational Community in Bloomfield Hills in the 1930s. She also knew him through her uncle, Alden B. Dow, a prominent Midland architect with whom Fredericks worked on architectural sculpture projects.

Honey Arbury was on the founding Board of Control at Saginaw Valley College in 1965 and remained active on that Board and the SVSU Foundation Board into the 1990s. Honey Arbury and her husband Ned Arbury and Mr. and Mrs. Fredericks generated the idea to have a permanent exhibit of Fredericks' work at the college. The Board of Control, the college and the Arburys worked together on an agreement to have the Marshall M. Fredericks Sculpture Gallery built within and adjacent to the new facilities for the art, music, and theatre departments. The Gallery, renamed Marshall M. Fredericks Sculpture Museum in 1999, opened to the public in the new Arbury Fine Arts Center in May 1988.

== Features ==
=== Main Exhibit Gallery ===
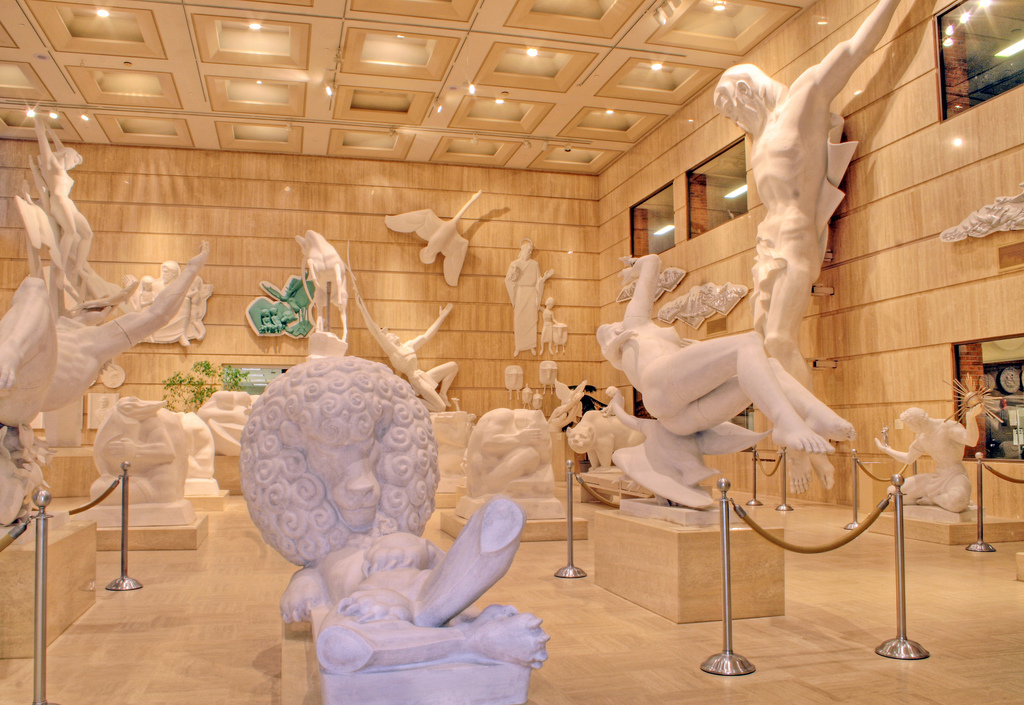
Marshall Fredericks Sculpture Museum interior

The Main Exhibit Gallery includes about 200 works, mostly plaster models, which span a career of over 70 years. The centerpiece is a 28-foot tall Christ statue on the south wall of the museum.

=== Special exhibitions ===
The temporary exhibition galleries feature changing exhibitions of international, national, regional and Michigan artists and showcase works from the museum collection. Exhibitions change every few months, and have included paintings, prints, sculpture, ceramics, quilts, drawings, photography and fine craft.

=== Sculptor’s Studio ===
The Sculptor's Studio is a permanent exhibit of Fredericks’ authentic objects, tools, and equipment arranged in a sequence to explain the casting process in a sculptor's studio environment.

=== Archives ===
The Archives project was initiated in 2005, following receipt of the business and personal records from Fredericks’ Birmingham home and Royal Oak studio in 2000. Saginaw Valley State University and the Marshall M. Fredericks Sculpture Museum are proud to be the recipient of this important archival collection.

=== Sculpture Garden ===
The Sculpture Garden, adjacent to the museum, includes a growing collection of more than 20 bronze casts of Fredericks’ sculptures.

== See also ==
- List of single-artist museums
