= Downtown Cleveland =

Central business district of Ohio, US

Coordinates: 41°29′56″N 81°41′23″W

- Neighborhood
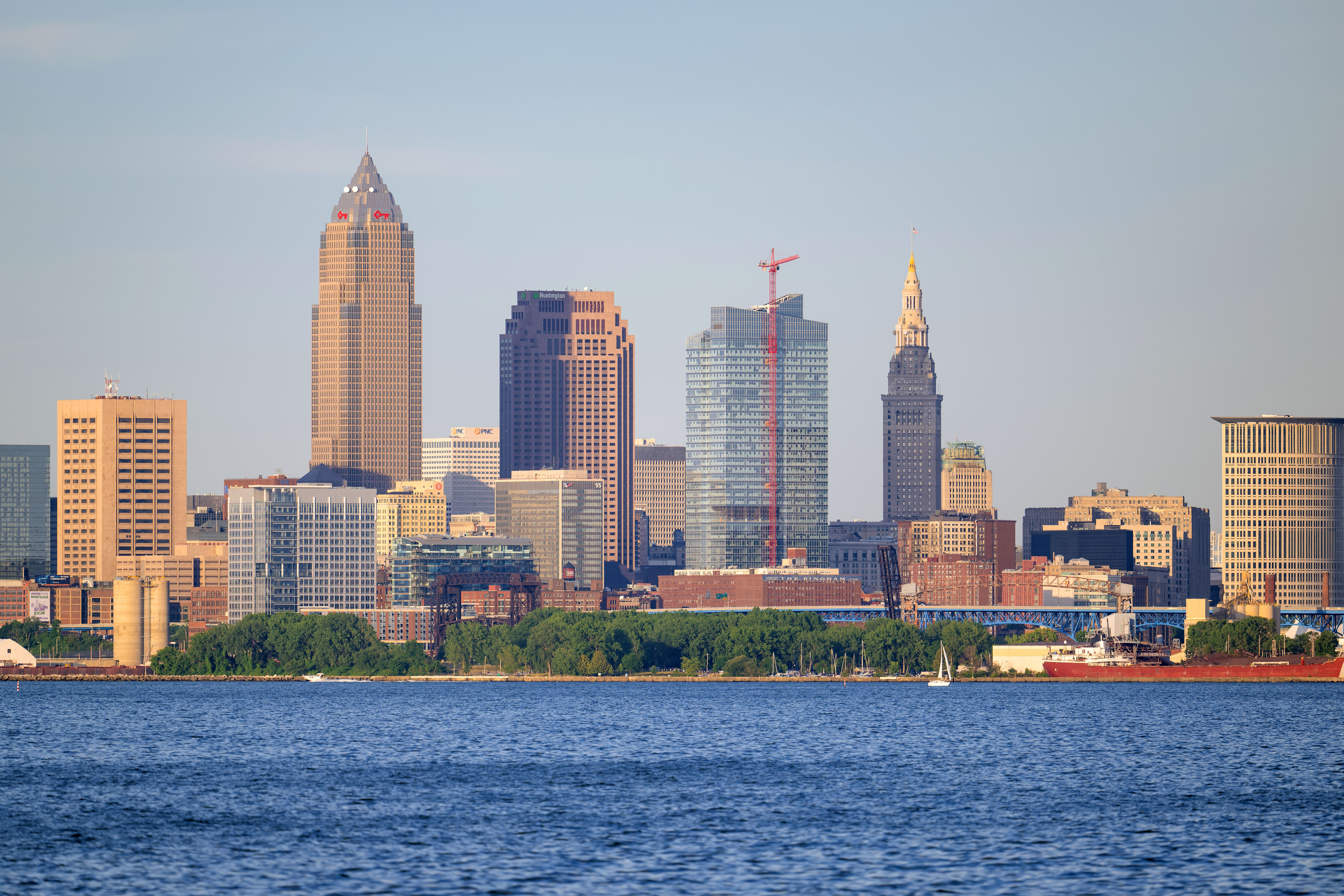
- Downtown Cleveland in June 2024

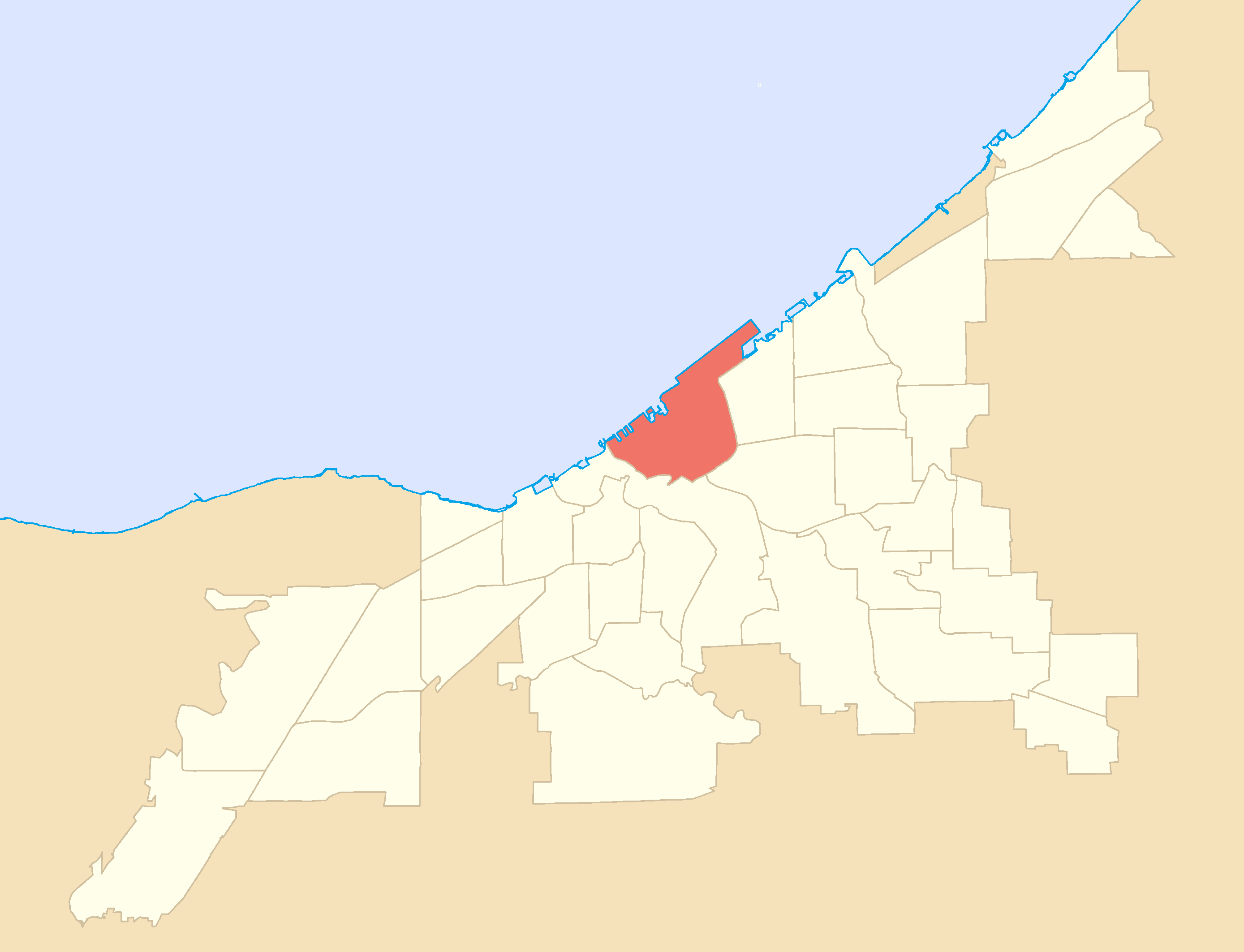
- Country: United States
- State: Ohio
- County: Cuyahoga
- City: Cleveland

Area
  - Total: 3.02 sq mi (7.82 km^{2})

Population (2020)
  - Total: 20,000
  - Density: 6,600/sq mi (2,600/km^{2})

Demographics
  - White: 53.1%
  - Black: 32%
  - Hispanic (of any race): 5.3%
  - Asian: 10.1%
  - Mixed and Other: 4.9%
- Time zone: UTC-5 (EST)
  - Summer (DST): UTC-4 (EDT)
- ZIP Codes: 44113, 44114, 44115
- Area code: 216
- Median income: $54,834
- Website: downtowncleveland.com
- Source: 2020 U.S. Census, City Planning Commission of Cleveland

Downtown Cleveland is the central business district of Cleveland, Ohio, United States. The economic and cultural center of the city and the Cleveland metropolitan area, it is Cleveland's oldest district, with its Public Square laid out by city founder General Moses Cleaveland in 1796.

Downtown Cleveland is bounded by Lake Erie to the north, the Cuyahoga Valley to the west, and Interstate 90 to the south and east. It encompasses several subdistricts, and its diverse architecture includes the Cleveland Mall, one of the most complete examples of City Beautiful design in the U.S. Downtown's residential population has grown significantly since the 2000s and especially 2010s, registering the largest population growth, by percentage, of any Cleveland neighborhood over that time.

== Districts ==
=== Public Square ===
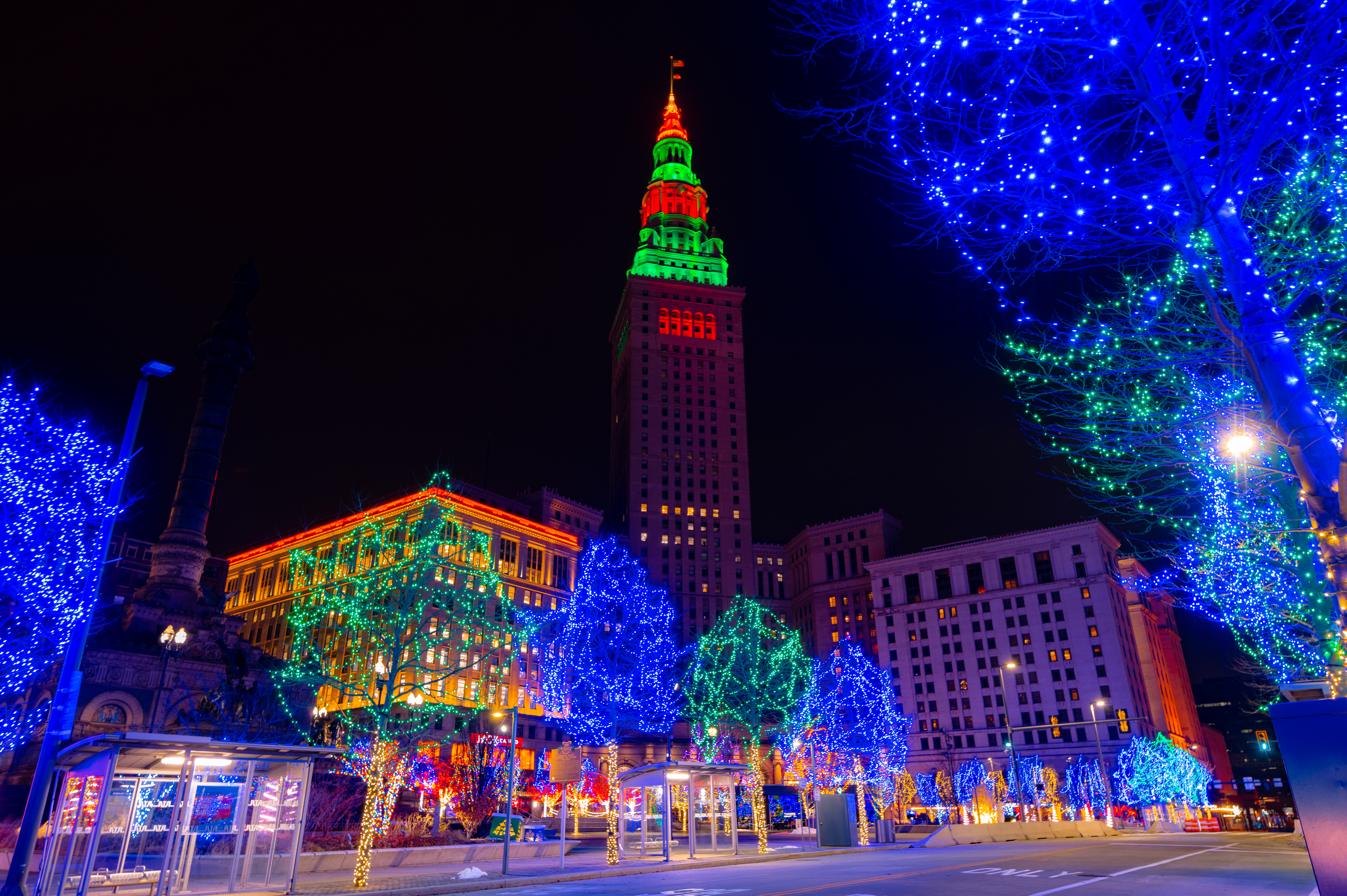
Terminal Tower at night from Public Square during Winterfest Cleveland

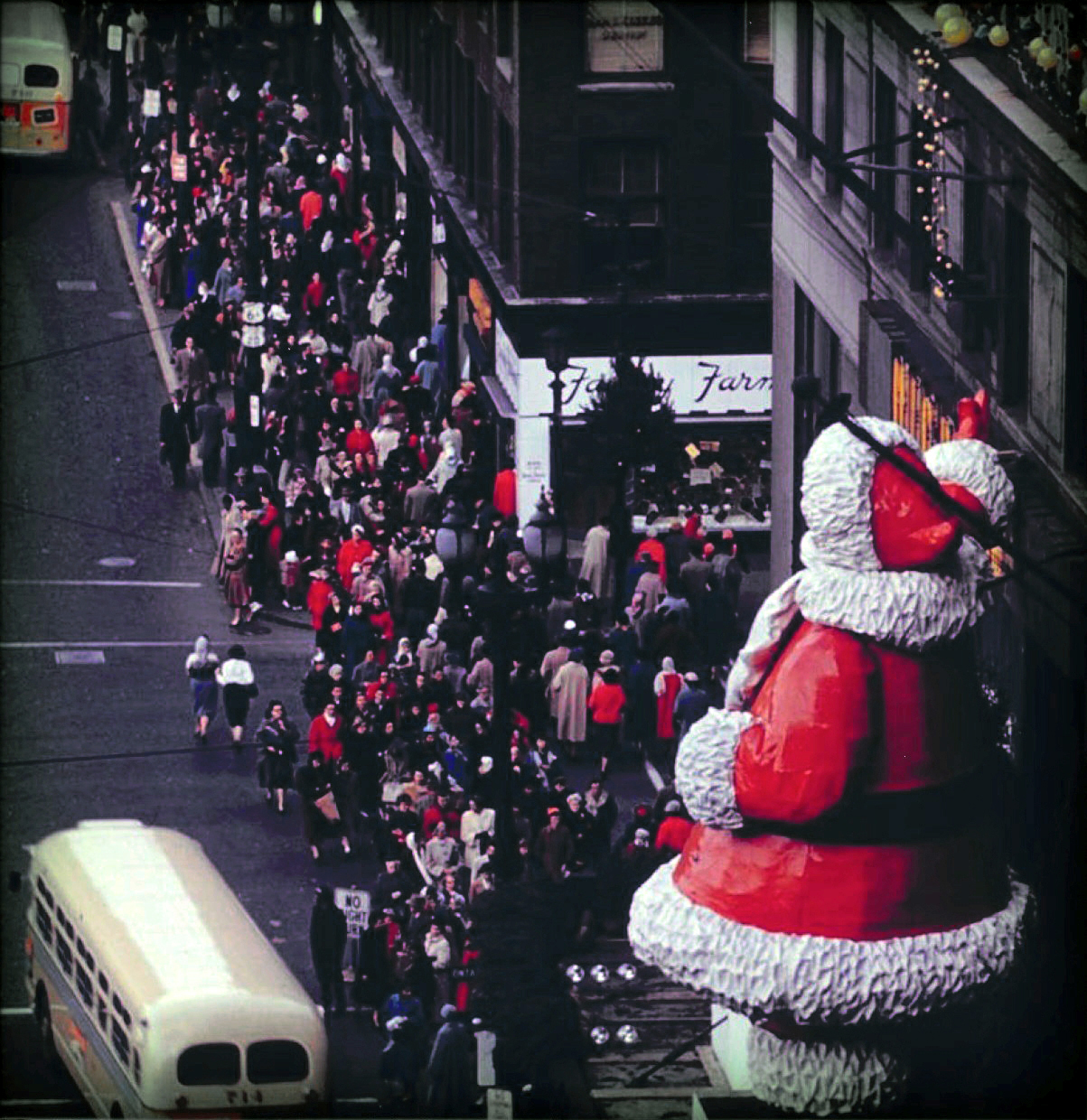
Christmas shoppers on Euclid Avenue and Ontario Street in the 1950s

The heart of downtown, Public Square was laid out by city founder Moses Cleaveland in 1796 and has remained largely unchanged. Based on the New England town square, it consists of a large open space, cut into quadrants by Ontario Street and Superior Avenue. Public Square is the symbolic heart of the city, and has hosted presidents, vast congregations of people, and a free annual 4th of July concert by the Cleveland Orchestra. At one time, Public Square was fenced off and inaccessible to vehicles.

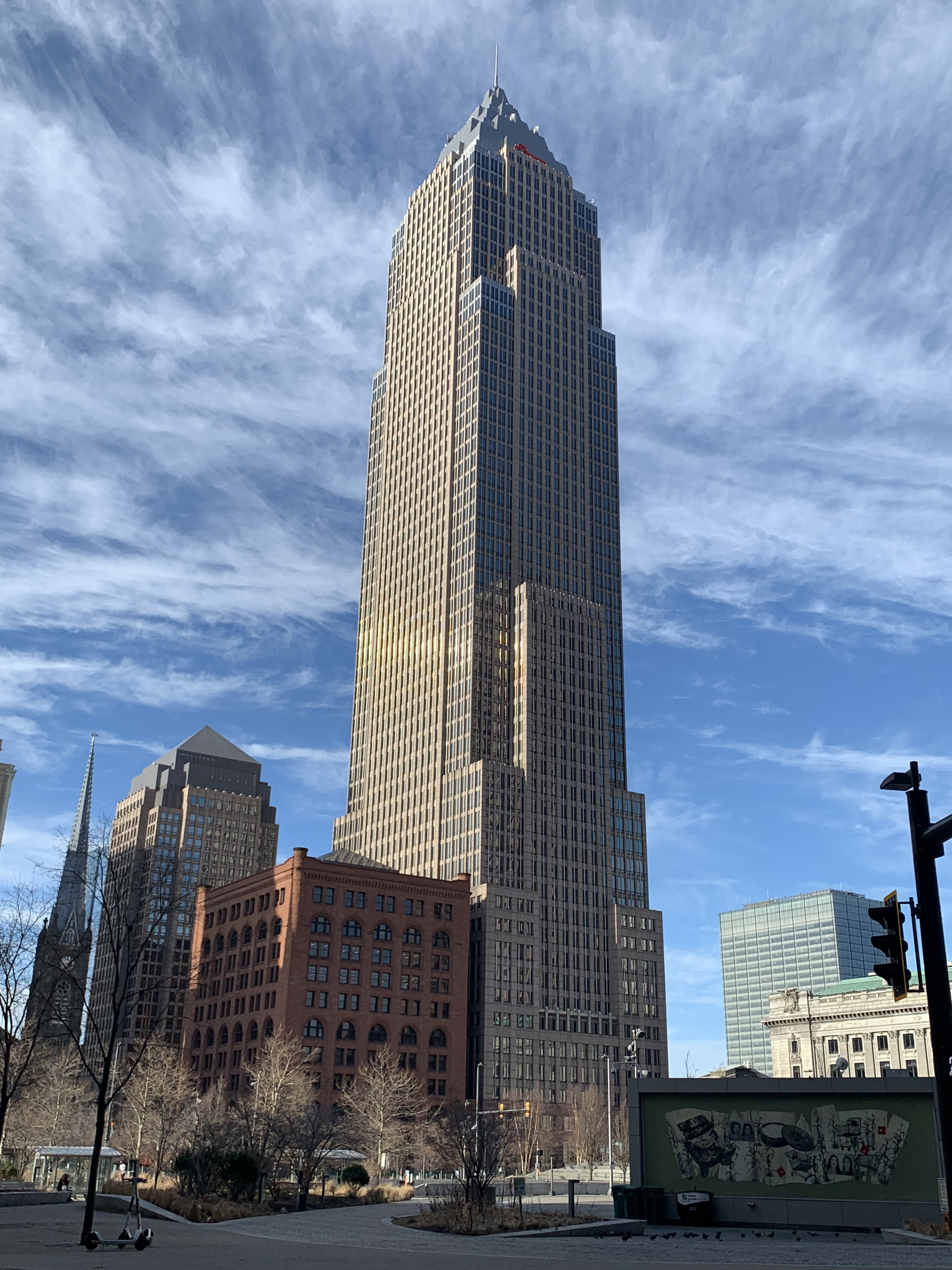
Key Tower is the tallest skyscraper in the Midwest outside of Chicago

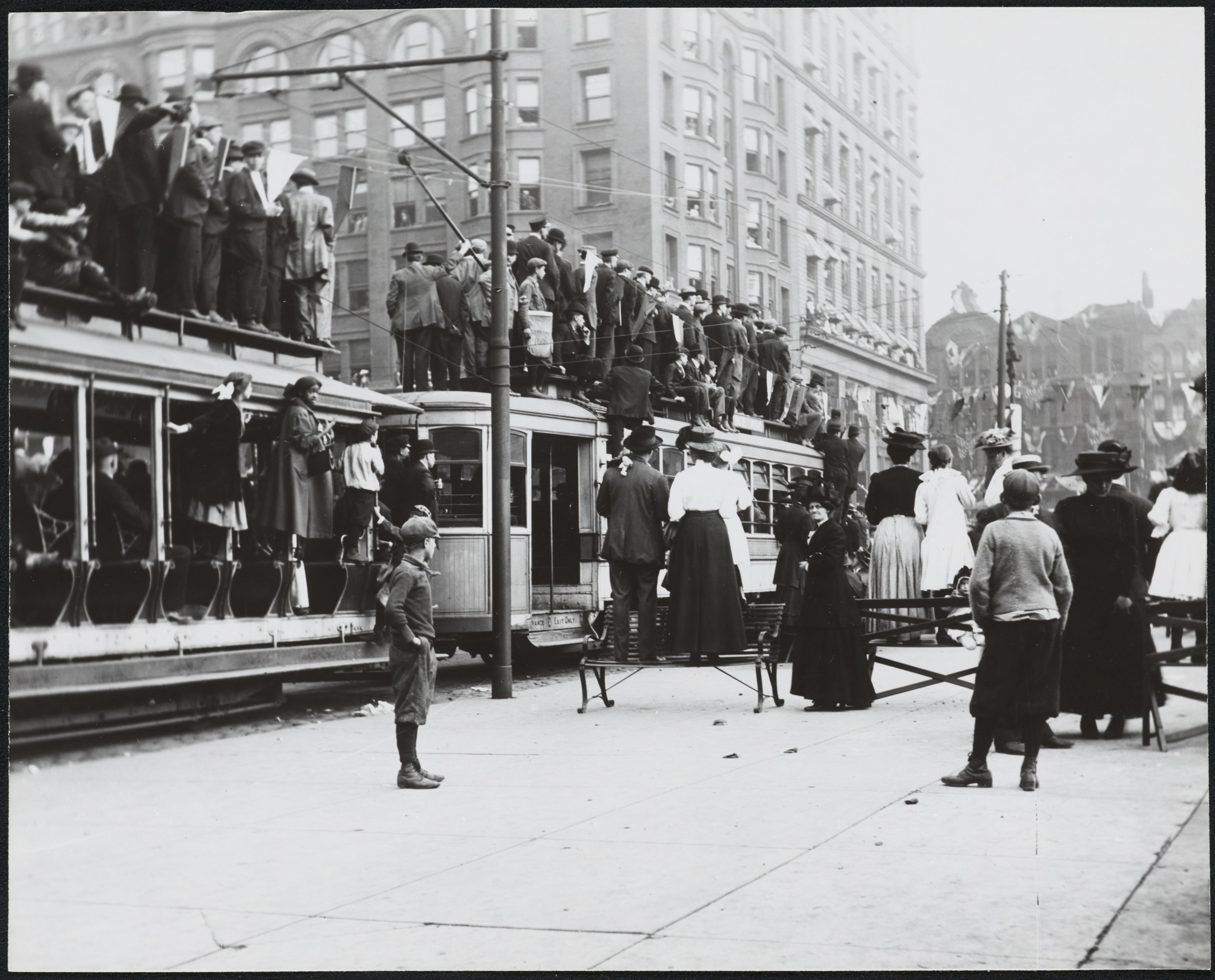
Parade spectators at Public Square, 1910

In 1860, the Perry Monument, a memorial to Commodore Oliver Hazard Perry's victory in the Battle of Lake Erie in the War of 1812, was dedicated in the center of Public Square. In 1892, it was moved out of the square, which by then had the fences removed after lobbying by commercial interests. Public Square is also home to the Soldiers' and Sailors' Monument, which commemorates residents of Cuyahoga County who served in the Civil War. Public Square also features a statue of Cleaveland; a statue of Tom L. Johnson, the city's most famous mayor; a large amount of shrubbery and other landscaping; and a large public fountain. The Consulate-General of Slovenia in Cleveland (formerly the Consulate-General of Yugoslavia in the city) is located in the 55 Public Square building.

Notable buildings on Public Square include the Terminal Tower, home to Tower City Center, 200 Public Square - the former BP Building (renamed in 2005), as well as Key Tower, the tallest building in Ohio and one of the tallest in the United States. Public Square is also home to the historic Old Stone Church, completed in 1855. The west side of Public Square was to become the headquarters of the Cleveland Trust Company, then called Ameritrust, but the project was cancelled after Ameritrust was purchased and merged into Key Bank, leaving that side of the square open to this day, with only a surface parking lot on the site.

In the golden age of department store retail from the late 19th century to the 1980s, Cleveland's major stores extended from Public Square east along Euclid Avenue. They included Higbee's, Bailey's, the May Company, Taylor's, Halle's, and Sterling Lindner Davis, which collectively represented one of the largest and most fashionable shopping districts in the country, often compared to New York's Fifth Avenue. Today, the buildings of the May Company, Taylor's, and Halle's are popular downtown apartment complexes, while the Higbee's building has been home to the Jack Cleveland Casino since 2012.

=== Gateway District ===
Revitalization of Cleveland's Historic Gateway District began in the 1990s with the Gateway complex, which included construction of Progressive Field and Rocket Arena, the homes of the MLB Cleveland Guardians, NBA Cleveland Cavaliers, and AHL Cleveland Monsters. The Gateway complex was built on parking lots on the site of the former Central Market. The baseball stadium and basketball arena are connected to Tower City Center, and RTA's rail transit system, via an enclosed walkway. The neighborhood includes retail, housing, and a large variety of restaurants.

=== East 4th Street ===
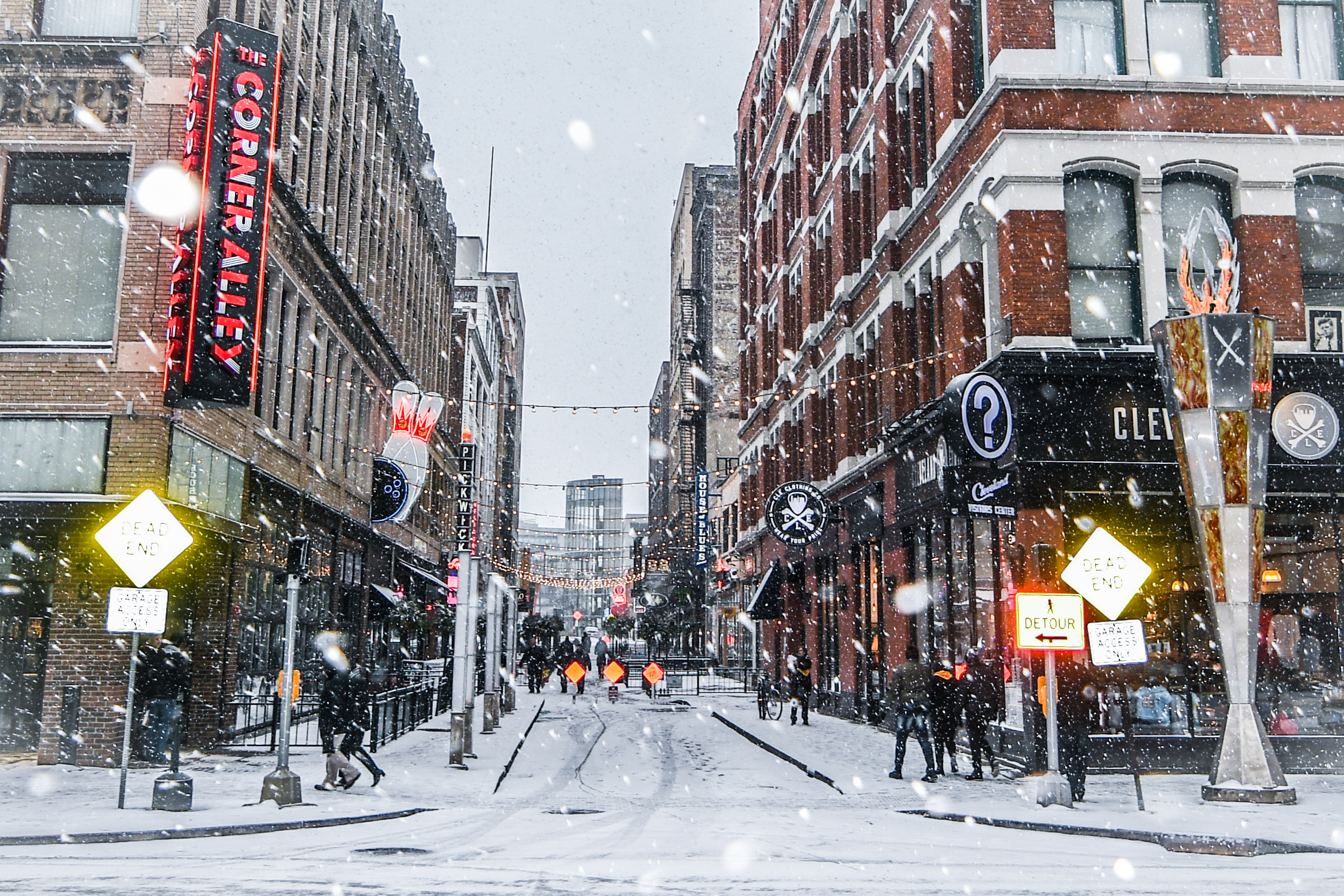
Winter on East 4th Street

East 4th Street is a popular restaurant and entertainment street adjacent to Prospect Avenue, Cleveland's historic "Radio Row." East 4th encompasses Cleveland's House of Blues, Iron Chef Michael Symon's Mabel's BBQ, comedy club/restaurant Pickwick and Frolic, as well as a dozen other dining and retail storefronts. The neighborhood is home to hundreds of residents who live in the apartments and loft condominiums above the storefronts. East 4th is also adjacent to the historic Cleveland Arcade, the first indoor shopping mall in the United States, built in 1890.

=== Warehouse District ===
Originally an early residential neighborhood, the Warehouse District was built into a warehousing and shipping neighborhood during the industrial rise of Cleveland, Within the past few decades, it has been converted again back into an entertainment, dining, and residential hub. The Warehouse District is the largest downtown neighborhood by population, and continues to grow with an assortment of shops, clubs, bars, and loft condos/apartments. West Sixth Street is known as the heart of the district. Famously, the 17-story Rockefeller Building sits on the corner West Sixth and Superior Ave erected by John D. Rockefeller.

=== Playhouse Square ===
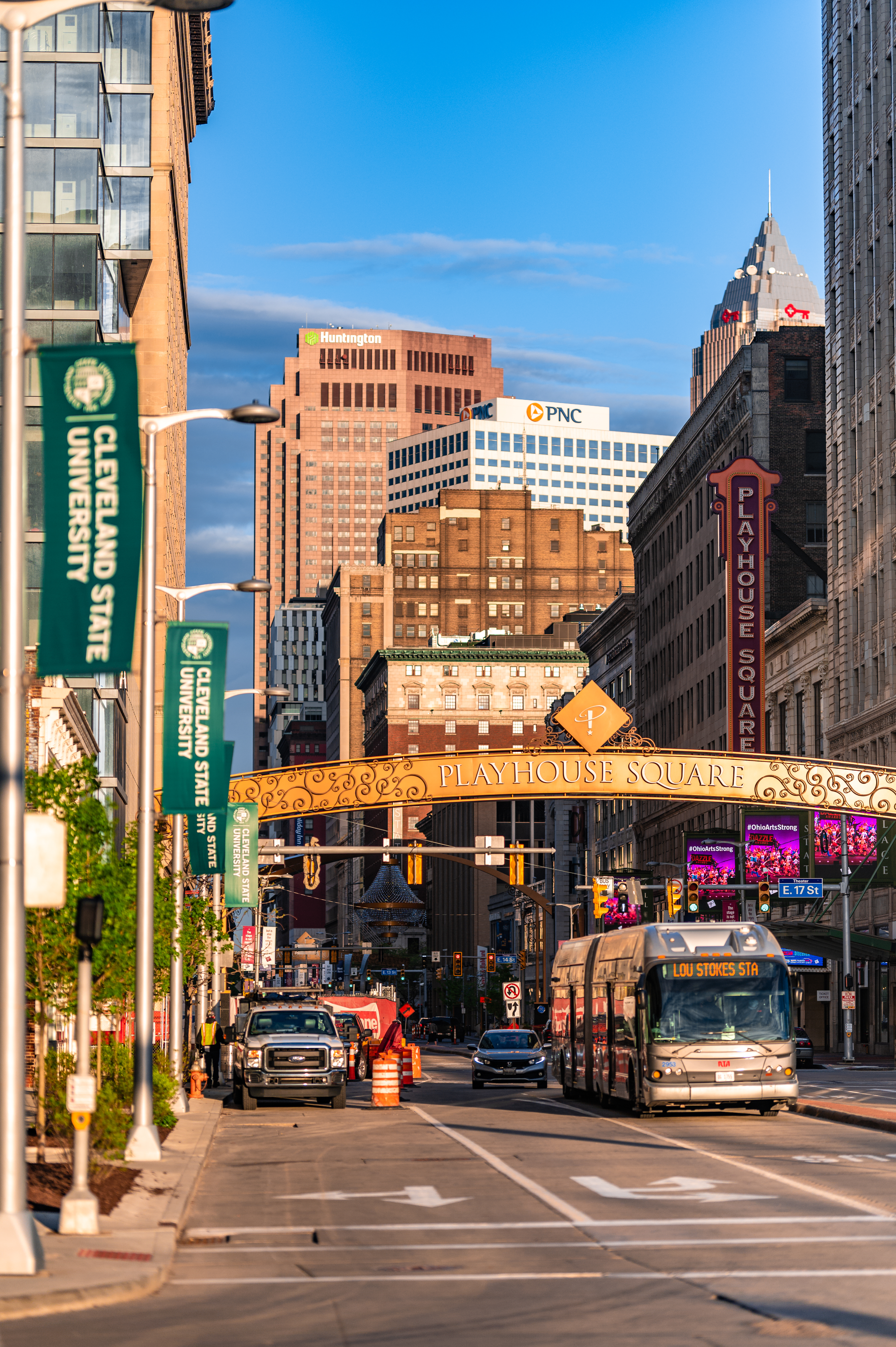
Playhouse Square

Home to the second-largest performing arts complex in the U.S., Playhouse Square is downtown's cultural heart. The area is dominated by five historic theaters built during the 1920s – State, Palace, Allen, Hanna, and Ohio theaters are all located in a cluster near the intersection of Euclid Avenue and E. 14th Street. Additionally, the smaller theaters include the 14th Street Theater, Kennedy's Theater, Westfield Insurance Studio Theater, Second Stage, and Helen Rosenfeld Lewis Bialosky Lab Theatre.

Ideastream Public Media teamed up with Playhouse Square to renovate the former Playhouse Square Building, transforming it from an empty office building to One Playhouse Square, a downtown broadcast headquarters. Now known as the Idea Center, the facility includes high definition television studios, control rooms, radio studios, and performance space fronting Euclid Avenue, as well as a variety of high-tech business startups and other tenants located on the building's upper floors. Since 2005, Ideastream's broadcast properties have been located at the Idea Center; this includes PBS station WVIZ (channel 25), NPR member WKSU (89.7 FM) and classical music/jazz outlet WCLV (90.3 FM). WKSU also is relayed over a regional network, including WCPN (104.9 FM). Residents of the district also include Cleveland Playhouse and Cleveland State University performing arts.

In spring 2014, a $16 million outdoor streetscape transformation was completed. Focusing primarily on lighting and signage, a centerpiece of a 4,600-piece LED crystal chandelier hangs over the Euclid Avenue and East 14th Street intersection 24-feet off the ground. According to the Guinness Book of World Records, it is the largest outdoor chandelier in the world. Other additions include four gateway signs spanning entry points, a large 1920s-era "Playhouse Square" sign at East 13th Street and Euclid Avenue intersection, a fire pit at Star Plaza, a 28-foot-tall digital display, and architectural lighting to show off details of the historic buildings.

=== Civic Center ===
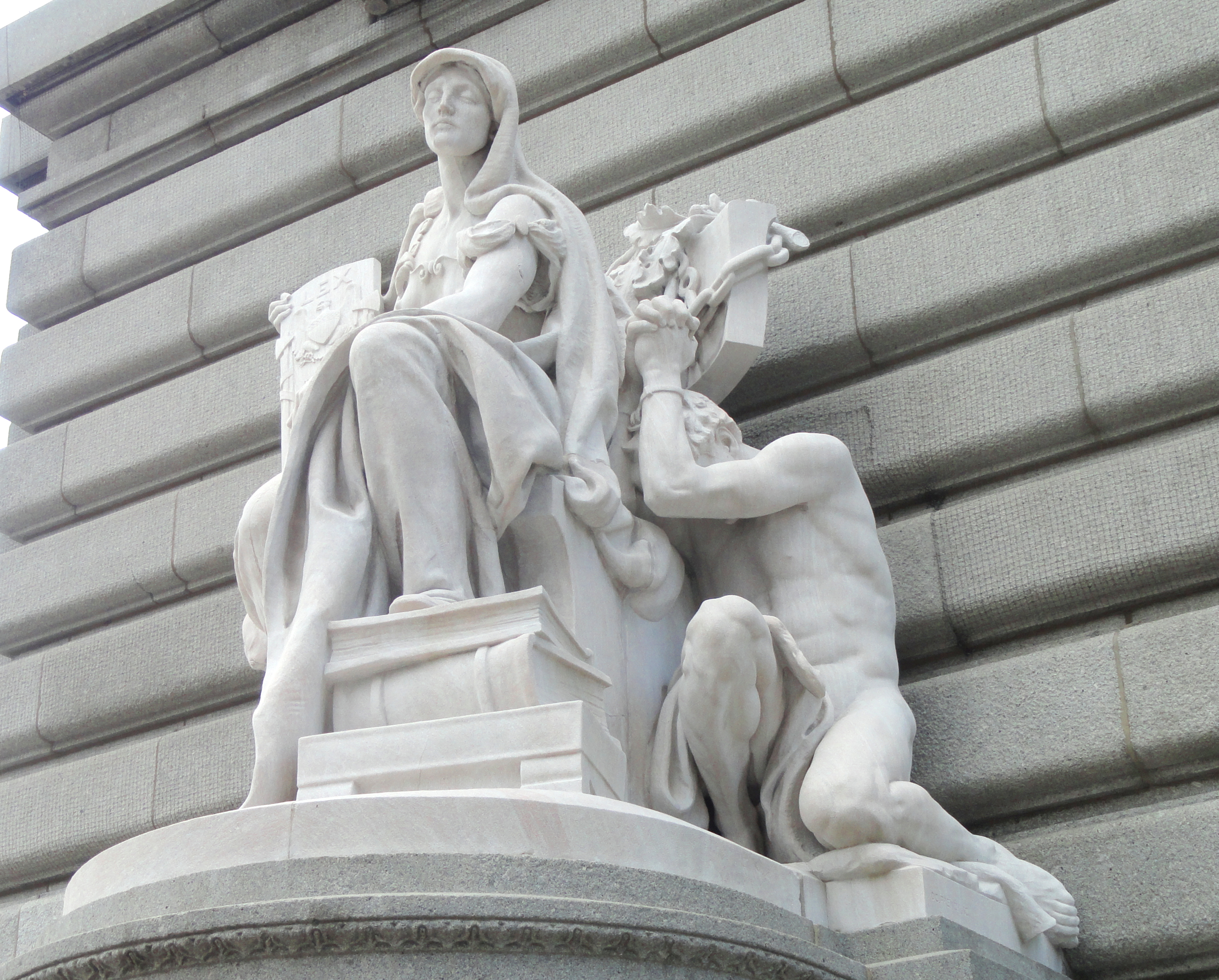
Jurisprudence by Daniel Chester French at the Howard M. Metzenbaum U.S. Courthouse on Superior Avenue

The Civic Center district holds Cleveland's governmental and public buildings. The most visible structure is the Justice Center Complex, consisting of the Cleveland Police Department headquarters and Cuyahoga County Jail. Other notable structures include Cleveland City Hall, Cuyahoga County and Cleveland Municipal Courts, Public Auditorium, Cleveland Public Library main buildings, the Federal Reserve Bank of Cleveland, the Howard M. Metzenbaum U.S. Courthouse, and the Cleveland Metropolitan School District administration building (now occupied by the Drury Plaza Hotel).

The Public Malls, Malls A, B, and C, also known as the Burnham Malls, hold public green space and gardens fronting the lake. The Fountain of Eternal Life, also known as the War Memorial Fountain, is centered on the Mall A. On the western edge, Willard Park is host to the controversial public art, known as the Free Stamp. On the eastern edge sits Fort Huntington Park, containing a statue of Commodore Oliver Hazard Perry commemorating the Battle of Lake Erie, a statue of Clevelander Jesse Owens, and the Cleveland Police Department memorial of officers killed in the line of duty. A major addition to the area is the $465 million Global Center for Health Innovation and Huntington Convention Center of Cleveland.

=== Nine-Twelve District ===
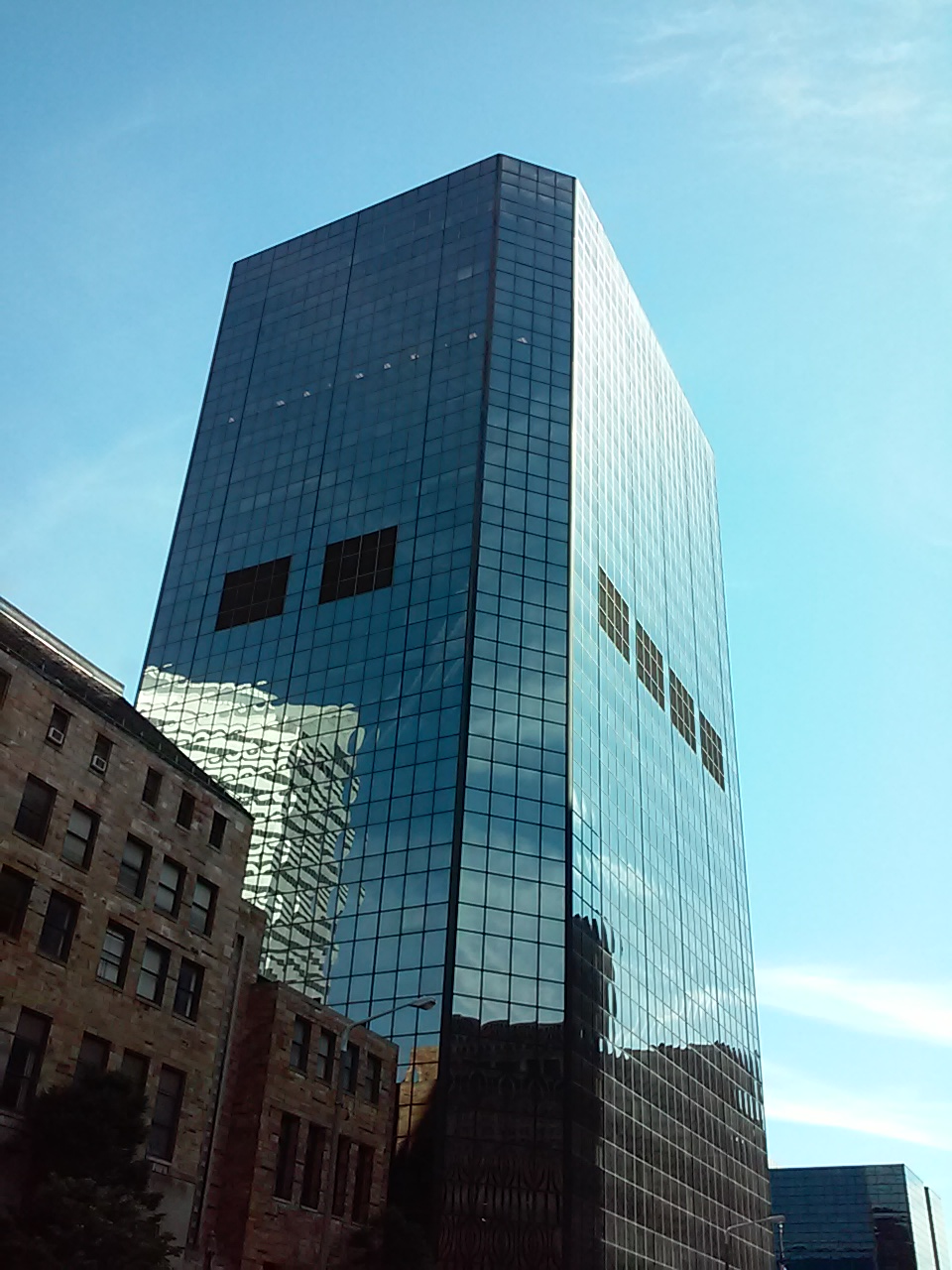
Eaton Center

Cleveland's financial district, the area around East 9th street from Lake Erie south to Prospect Avenue, serves as corporate or regional home to many firms in the financial, business, legal, communications and publishing sectors of the city's economy.

Architecturally, the area is characterized by large, glass office towers built predominately in the 1950s to 1980s. The tallest is Erieview Tower at 40-stories, the centerpiece of the largely unbuilt Erieview Urban Renewal Project of the 1960s. The Galleria was added to the tower in the 1980s originally as a shopping mall, but today serves as a mix of small stores, office space, gardens under the glass, radio headquarters, and a food court. The 31-story One Cleveland Center is nicknamed the "silver chisel" due to its distinct shape. The seat of the Roman Catholic Diocese of Cleveland, the Cathedral of St. John the Evangelist, is located at the heart of the district on E.9th. There is a large cluster of high-rise downtown housing in this area, largely concentrated in the East 12th Street area.

Alexander Mann's U.S. headquarters and Medical Mutual headquarters are present here. The City Club of Cleveland is housed in the City Club Building, which is at the corner of East Ninth and Euclid.

WKYC, the local NBC affiliate, has its broadcast center on Lakeside Avenue on the northern end of the district. WOIO, the CBS affiliate, and sister station WUAB, both owned by Gray Television are housed in Reserve Square on East 12th Street.

=== Short Vincent ===
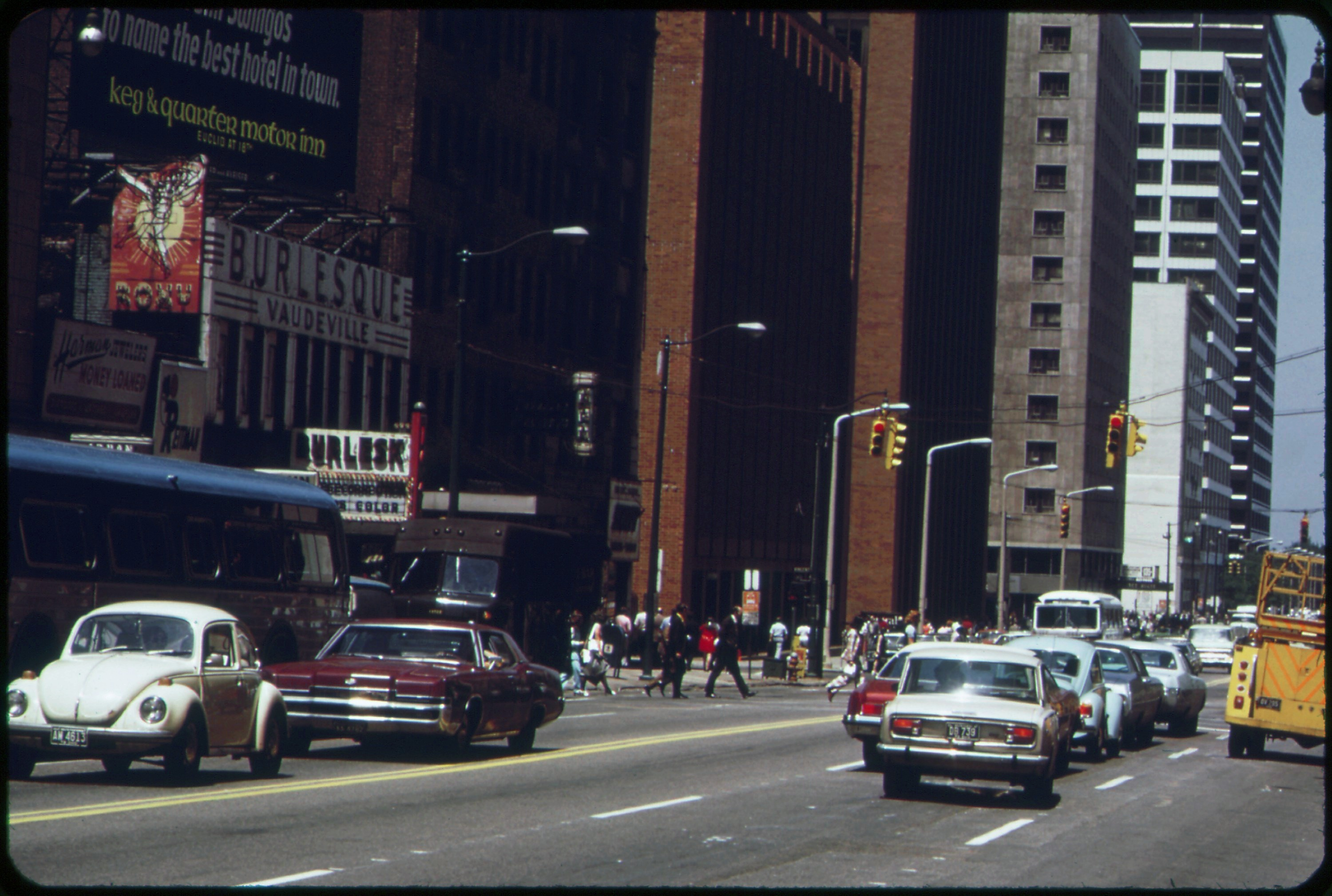
East 9th Street with the Roxy Burlesque in 1973

Short Vincent, located between East 6th and East 9th Street, is short street that once served as one of Cleveland's major entertainment districts and a center for the city's nightlife. Densely packed with restaurants, dive bars, jazz clubs, and bounded by the risqué Roxy Burlesque Theater and the art deco Bond Clothing Store, the district first emerged in the late 1920s and reached its height in the 1940s and 1950s.

Short Vincent became the "gathering place for gamblers, sports figures, racketeers, lawyers, and newspapermen" and "offered good food, underworld gossip, and the odds on anything." The street's Theatrical Grill served as the "headquarters" for notorious mobster Shondor Birns, but also hosted visiting celebrities such as Frank Sinatra, Marilyn Monroe, Dean Martin, Lauren Bacall, Tony Bennett, Judy Garland, and Milton Berle, among many others. Mobster Danny Greene and boxing promoter Don King were also regulars on the Short Vincent. The north side of the street was considered the "respectable" side, while the south side was a center for the numbers racket and was "studded with girlie shows." The area fell into decline by the 1960s and 1970s and disappeared as an entertainment district with the expansion of National City Bank (today the PNC Center) and the demolition of long-time Short Vincent establishments in the late 1970s.

=== North Coast Harbor ===
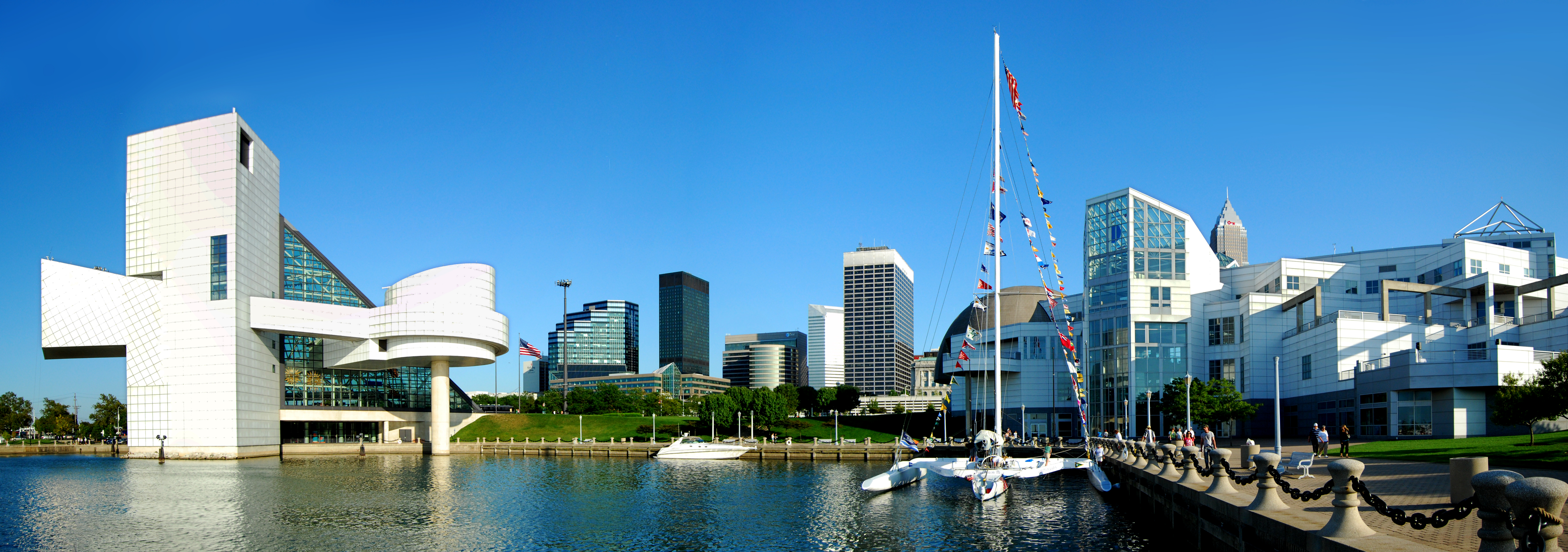
Cleveland's North Coast Harbor and the Rock and Roll Hall of Fame

Home to the Rock and Roll Hall of Fame and Museum, Great Lakes Science Center, Huntington Bank Field, Steamship William G. Mather Maritime Museum and the USS Cod, North Coast Harbor is the tourist district of downtown Cleveland. The North Coast District is home to the city's port, although there are long-term plans to move the port west of the river and open up the area for housing and lakefront development. North Coast is also the former home of Cleveland Stadium, which served as a home field for the Cleveland Indians of Major League Baseball until 1993 and of the Cleveland Browns of the National Football League (NFL) until 1995. Cleveland Stadium was torn down in late 1996 as part of the Cleveland Browns relocation controversy, and was replaced with Huntington Bank Field, which serves as the home of the NFL franchise. Cleveland Burke Lakefront Airport is located east of the Rock Hall, and serves as a commuter and business airport that reduces small aircraft traffic at the larger Cleveland Hopkins International Airport, located southwest of downtown. The district fronts Lake Erie on the north and also includes Voinovich Park and a fishing pier. Plans for the city's lakefront include adding thousands of housing units, retail shops, a marina, and other amenities to North Coast Harbor.

=== Campus District ===
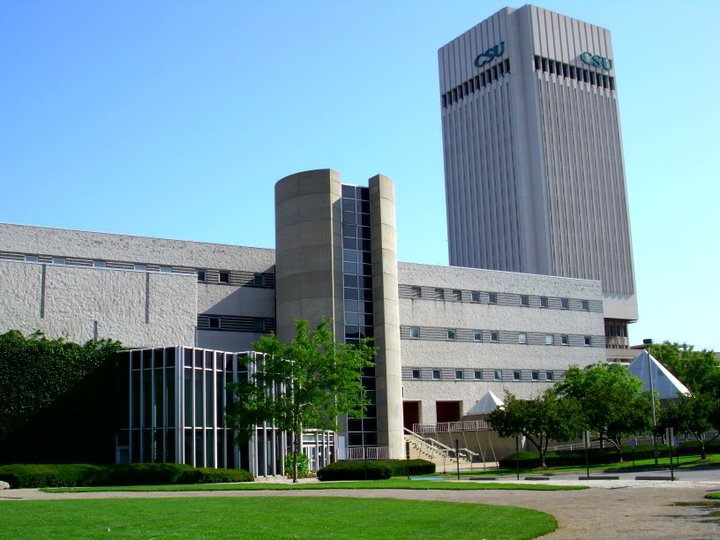
School of Communication at CSU with the Rhodes Tower in background

The Campus District is a 500-acre (2.0 km^{2}) downtown Cleveland neighborhood just east of the central business district. The district is bordered by Lakeside Avenue to the north, Broadway Avenue to the south, East 17th Street to the west and East 30th Street to the east. Members of the Campus District include Cleveland State University, St. Vincent Charity Medical Center, Cuyahoga Community College and more.

Cleveland State University has in past years been derided as an open enrollment commuter school, but has moved to dispel that belief. The university is progressing through a master plan to raise standards, enrollment, and rebuild its fortress-like campus. CSU plans to build a college town adjacent to downtown, including new retail, restaurants and housing to serve an increase of resident students planned to be in the thousands.

The university's desire to attract more traditional college students and begin to raise its stature as a research university figure into these plans a great deal, and CSU opened its second residence hall, a complete retrofit of Fenn Tower, in the fall of 2006. Over the past decade, CSU has partnered with the city and other area stakeholders to transfer technology research into startup companies and enterprises, improving the economy of the area and stimulating downtown life in the Quadrangle. As part of CSU, the Wolstein Center, formerly the CSU Convocation Center, is located in the Campus District, and serves as the home of CSU Men's Basketball and various concerts and special events throughout the year.

=== Superior Arts District ===
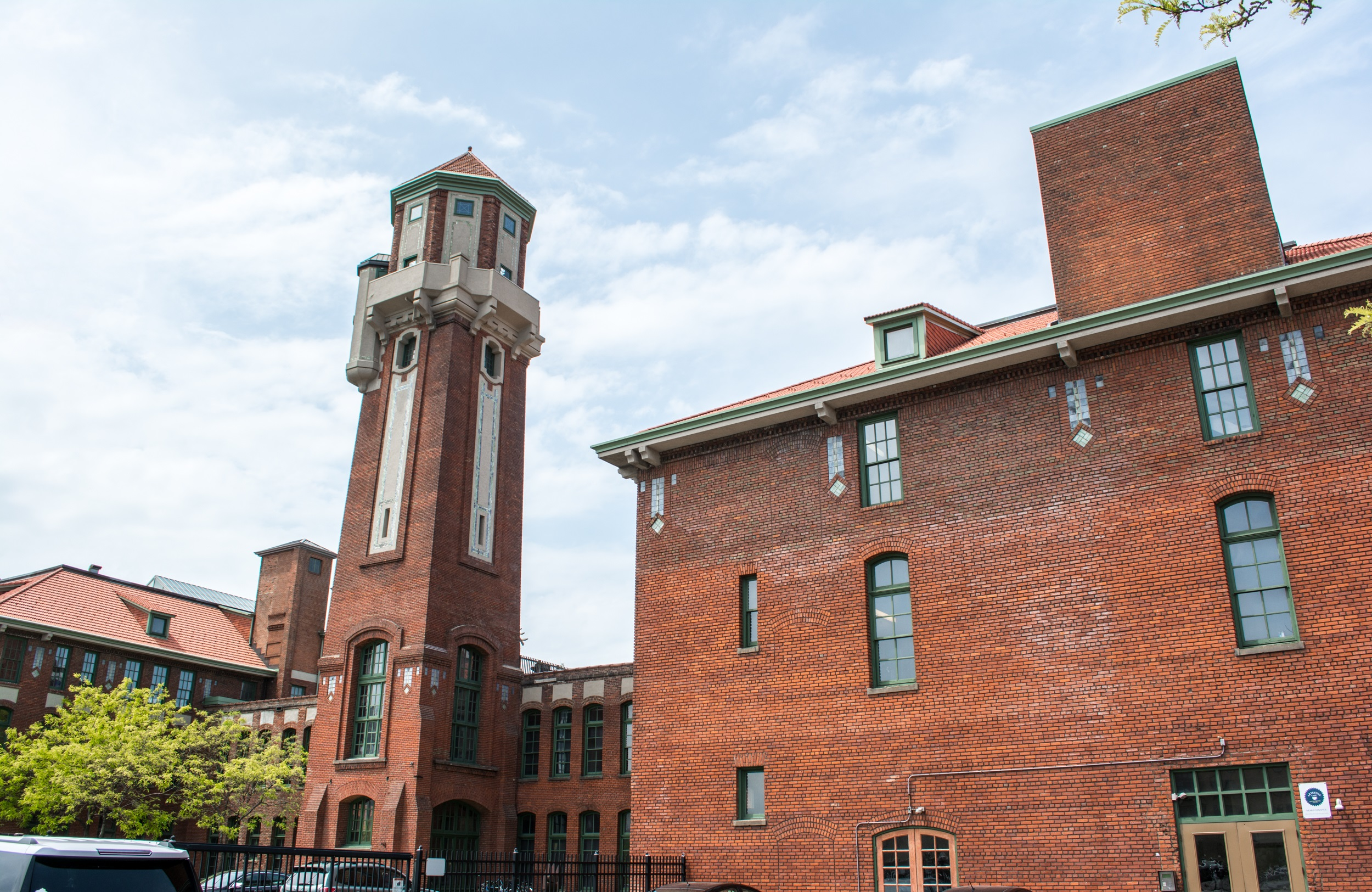
The Tower Press Building in the Superior Arts District

Located north of Campus District is the Superior Arts District. The district once served as the center of Cleveland's garment industry in the late 19th and early 20th centuries, "second only to New York." However, as Cleveland's garment industry declined, many of the district's buildings became vacant and abandoned.

Bruce Madorsky and Dan "Daffy Dan" Gray were the first to see the potential in developing the area. Beginning in the 2010s, Madorsky and Gray began selling their investments in the district, creating the conditions for additional revitalization. In 2016, the Superior Arts District was formally split from the Campus District to "promote safety, growth, and vitality" in the area. Today, the mixed use area serves as a live-work district for local artists, and includes several apartments, bars, restaurants, and cafes.

=== The Flats ===
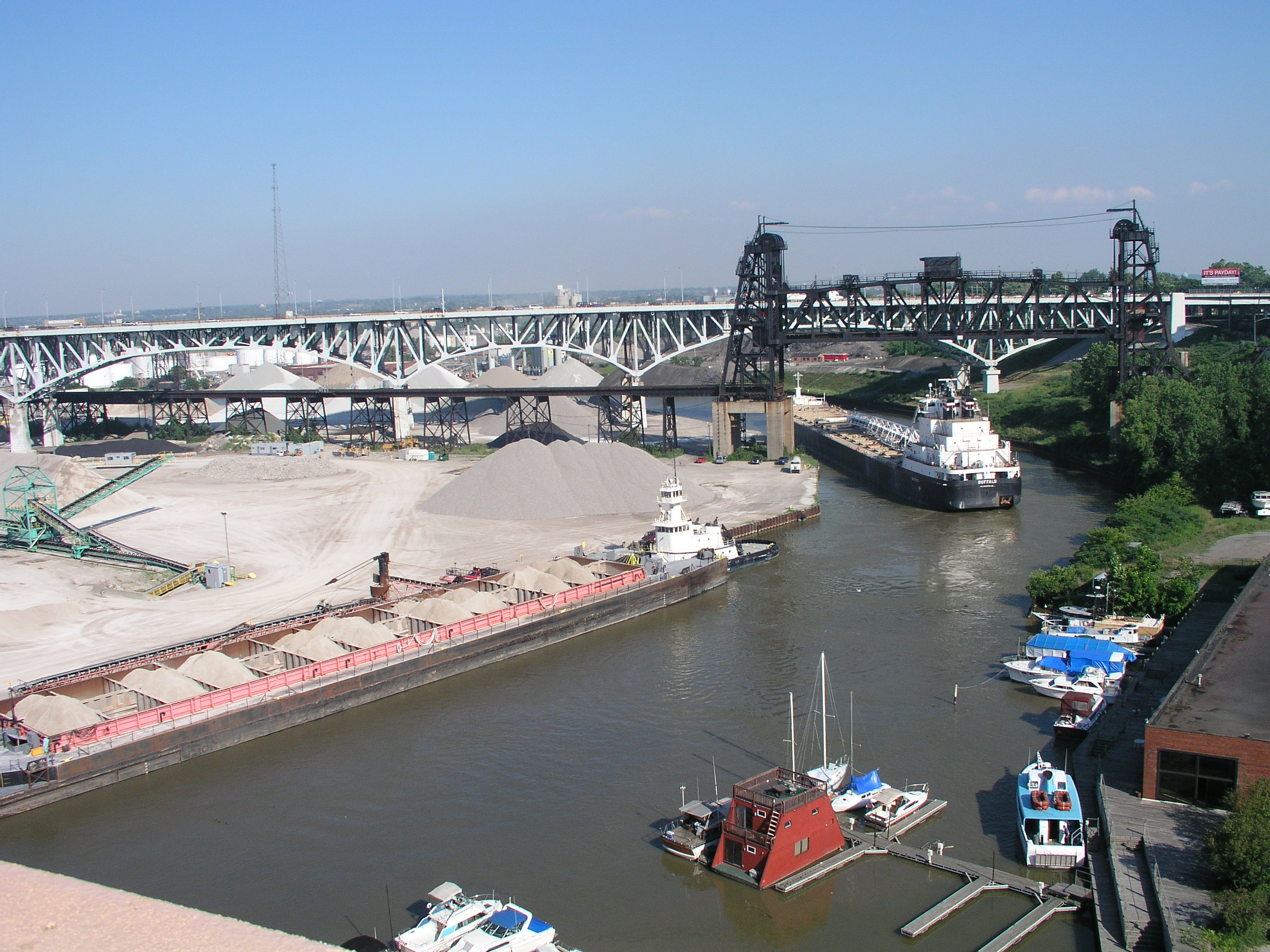
The Flats

The Cuyahoga River splits The Flats into two halves: the East Bank of the Flats and the West Bank of the Flats. Although the Cleveland City Planning Commission considers most of the area to be part of the Cuyahoga Valley neighborhood, it also defines part of the East Bank as an extension of Downtown. Historically significant, the Flats served as the location of Moses Cleaveland's first landing when he founded the city. It was also the location of some of the earliest populations of Cleveland. Lorenzo Carter, the first permanent European settler in the city, built his cabin on the banks of the Cuyahoga in the Flats.

Throughout much of Cleveland history, the Flats area was almost entirely industrial. By the 1980s, it had become a popular nightlife district in Cleveland. Its demise in the early 2000s spurred a complete redevelopment where a majority of the existing buildings were demolished. In its place, an 8-story Aloft Hotel and a 21-story office tower were built. Restaurants, apartments, and a riverside promenade are planned for Phase II of this mixed-use project. The West Bank of the Flats contains the majority of the district's residential population, primary stemming from a set of apartments and condos known as Stonebridge. The areas also boasts bars, restaurants, jet ski rental, strip clubs, and, most recently, the home of the Greater Cleveland Aquarium. The current state of the Flats is in mixed-use redevelopment.

== Demographics ==
In December 2020, Crain's Cleveland Business estimated Downtown's population to be 20,000. According to the 2020 census, there are 7,244 occupied units in Downtown out of a total 9,569 units, which is a 75.7% occupancy rate and, despite Crain's optimistic numbers, the census also reports 13,338 people living in the Downtown area. The demographic composition of Downtown in 2020 was 53.1% white, 32% African American, 10.1% Asian and Pacific Islander, and 4.9% mixed and other groups. Hispanics or Latinos of any race were 5.3% of the population. The median household income was $54,834. Downtown's foreign-born population was 17.2% in 2019.

== Recent developments and projects ==
Reinvestment in the area in the mid-1990s spurred a rebirth in Downtown. As of 2026, Downtown Cleveland has seen $4.8 billion in residential and commercial developments. Based on 2024-2025 reports, more than 95,000 people worked in the district, which in 2026 contained approximately 10 to 16.1 million square feet of rentable office space.

=== Euclid Corridor ===
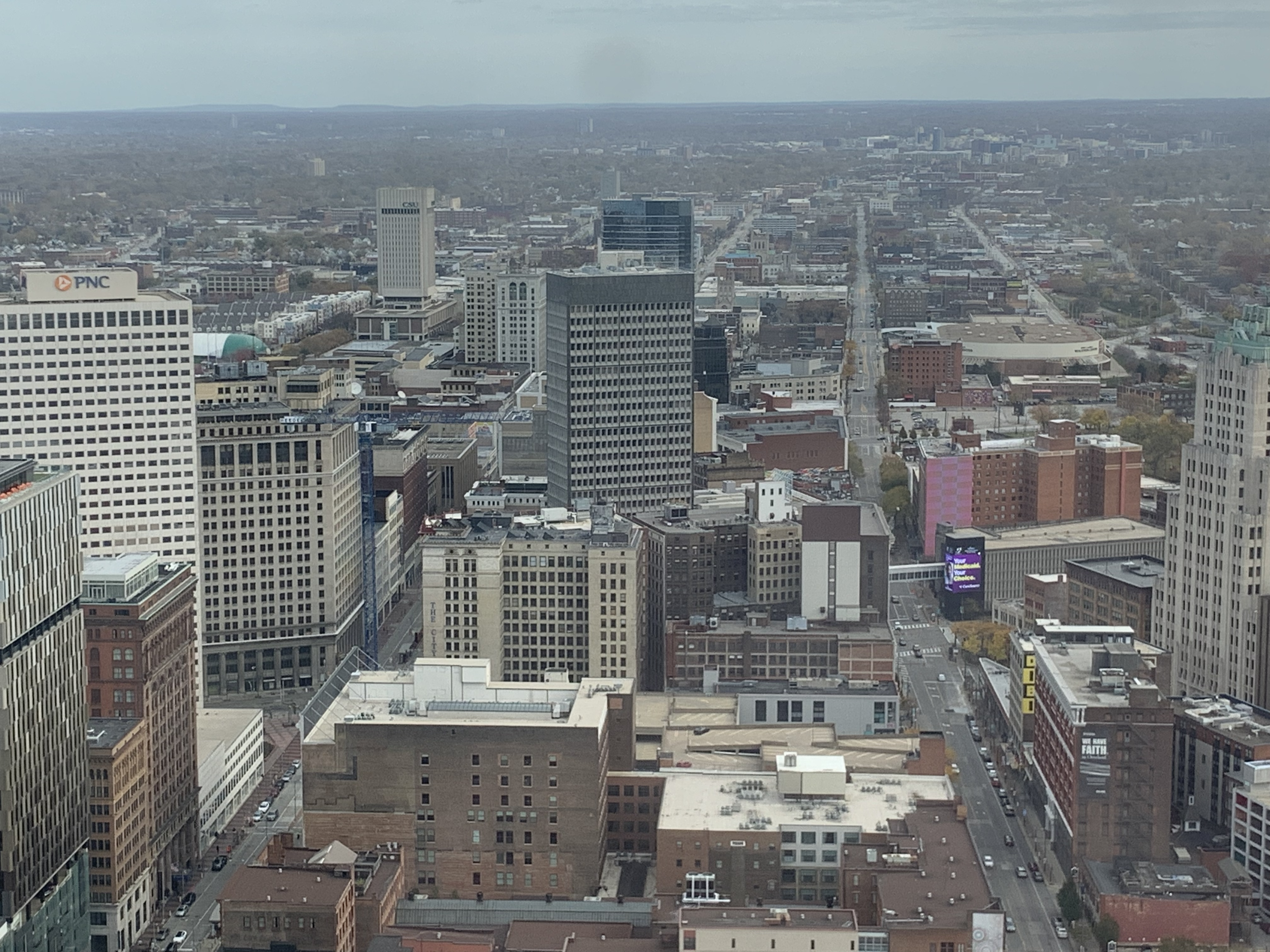
Cleveland skyline looking east from Terminal Tower observation deck

The $197 million Euclid Corridor Transportation Project connected downtown, Midtown, and University Circle by introducing bus rapid transit (BRT) to the city in the form of the HealthLine. The project involved a total reconstruction of Euclid Avenue from Public Square to beyond University Circle (located approximately 4 miles (6.4 km) east of downtown), and included bus-only lanes with center-median station boarding, priority signaling, and fast commute times. In addition to transit and road improvements, the transportation project also invested heavily in the Euclid Avenue streetscape, rebuilding the street from storefront to storefront, removing old vaults and streetcar tracks, and building new sidewalks, lighting, and landscaping.

The project included a large public arts component, with different areas of the Euclid Corridor route being addressed by local and national artists. The project has spurred investments in residential, retail, office, and mixed-use redevelopments, including over 4,000 residential units along the corridor. In addition to the BRT line, the Downtown Cleveland Alliance funded a study on retail feasibility on the avenue, focusing on the area between CSU and Public Square.

=== Medical Center and Convention Center ===
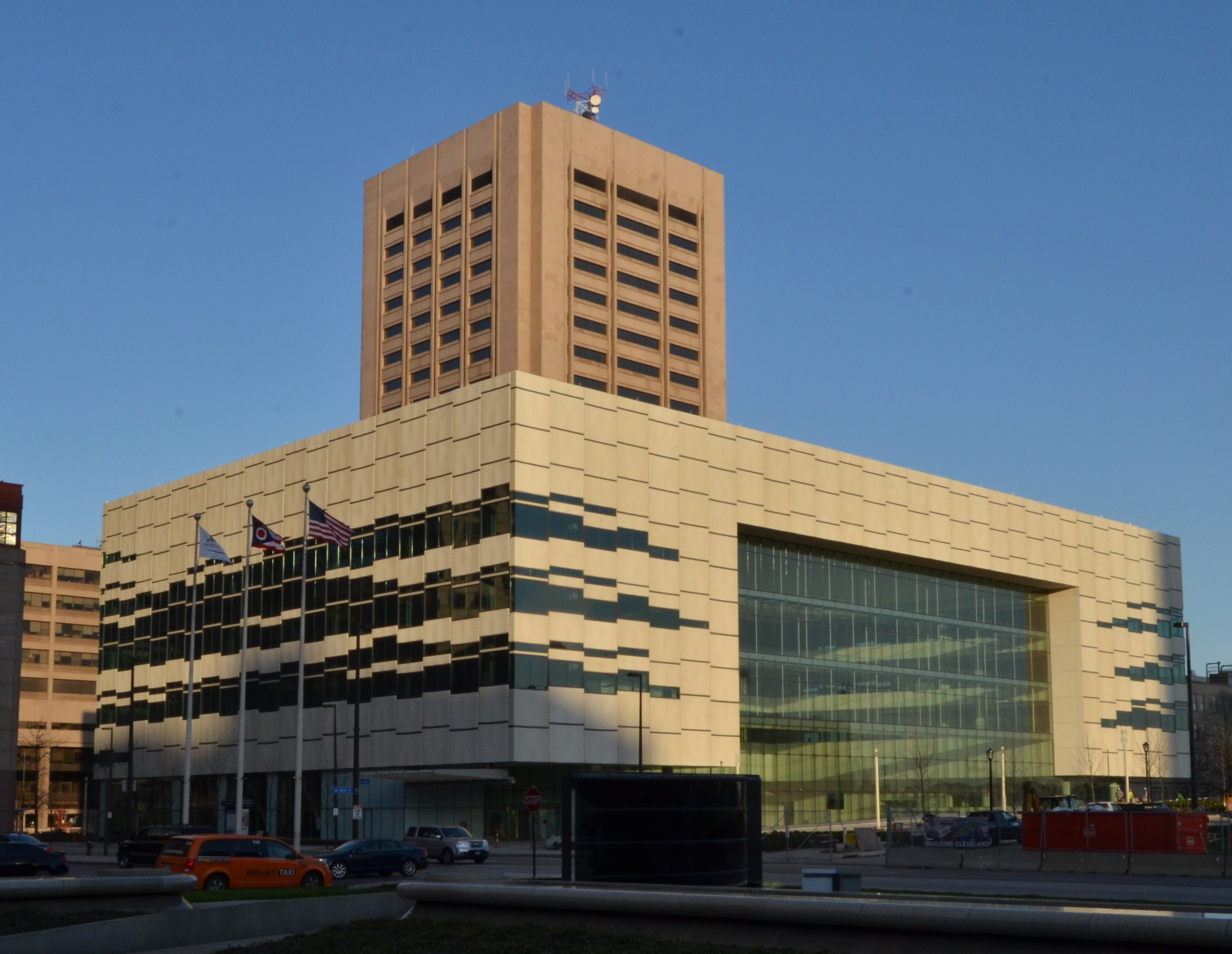
Global Center for Health Innovation under construction in 2012. The window shape is meant to mimic DNA structure.

A $465 million Global Center for Health Innovation, previously known as the Medical Mart, and Cleveland Convention Center opened in the summer of 2013. The 1.1-million-square-foot campus consists of a 235,000-square-foot Global Center for Health Innovation and a 750,000-square-foot Convention Center. The LEED Silver-certified Convention Center includes a 225,928-square-foot exhibit hall divisible into three halls, as well as 46,166 square feet of total ballroom space, made up of three grand ballrooms totaling 32,193 square feet and two junior ballrooms totaling 10,937 square feet. Views of Lake Erie from a 9,520-square-foot patio completes the northern border of the complex. The project was funded by a 0.25 percent increase in Cuyahoga County sales tax. Permanent tenants include Healthcare Information and Management Systems Society, Philips Healthcare, GE Healthcare, Johnson Controls, the Cleveland Clinic, and University Hospitals.

=== Flats East Bank ===
A multiphase, $500 million mixed-use redevelopment along the East Bank of the Flats is being developed and financed by the Wolstein Group and Fairmount Properties.

Opening in June 2013, the $275 million first phase included a 23-story office tower, 8-story Aloft hotel, restaurants, and a 16,000 sq. ft. health club, The office tower has been named the "Ernst and Young building." The two anchor tenants include the law firm Tucker Ellis and West, and the largest tenant, Ernst and Young. The 450,000 sq. ft. office tower is all Class A office space and features a green, open-air rooftop terrace.

Two Waterfront Line Rapid stations, Settlers Landing station and Main Avenue station received $375,000 upgrades. Work at both stations includes replacing brick and concrete pavers, repairing the glass shelters, and demolishing ticket booths. At Settlers Landing, crews will restore eight etched glass panels that act as wind screens. The artwork depicts scenes of Cleveland's settlement and the evolution of transportation.

=== Flats West Bank ===
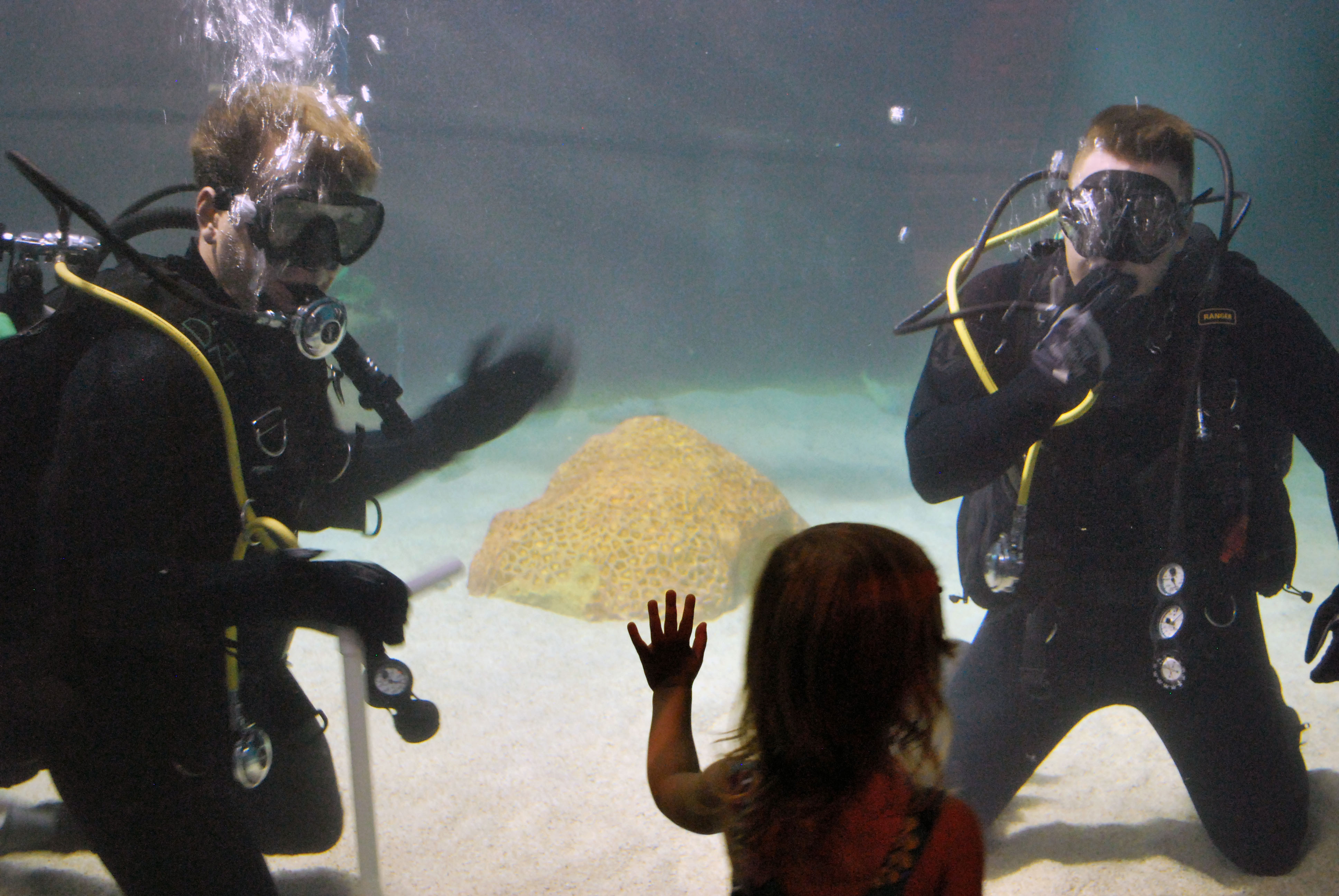
The Greater Cleveland Aquarium

A $33 million Greater Cleveland Aquarium opened on Jan 21, 2012, located at the FirstEnergy Powerhouse as the only freestanding aquarium in the state of Ohio. The aquarium takes up 70,000 square feet in the powerhouse's basement and contains over a million gallons of water in 42 tanks. The main feature of the aquarium is Marinescape's Seatube®, a 145-foot-long clear tunnel, known as a Seatube. The attraction was constructed around the building's architectural characteristics—including its smokestacks, columns and narrow hallways. Developers were not allowed to modify the structure or paint some walls because the old complex is on the National Register of Historic Places. The Greater Cleveland Aquarium was the first in the United States by New Zealand-based developer Marinescape NZ Ltd., who has built more than 20 aquariums in Europe, Asia, and Australia.

Jacobs Pavilion at Nautica is a 5000-seat outdoor amphitheater. In 2012, it underwent in $1 million upgrade that included a new entrance constructed 200 feet north of the old one, creating space for an expanded riverfront plaza. Other upgrades included new brick pavement for the plaza and new fencing.

In the fall of 2010, the Trust for Public Land and the Cleveland Rowing Foundation successfully purchased seven acres of commercial riverfront land for $3.2 million. The partnership is converting the vacant concrete-covered site into Rivergate Park, a new recreational center in the Flats. Officially opened in May 2011, the park preserves public access to the Cuyahoga River for access to activities including kayaking, canoeing, rowing and dragon boating. Long-term plans include a canoe/kayak launch facility, concessions, and public restrooms. Cleveland Metroparks will replace the concrete and gravel on their land and replace it with grass, trees and other park amenities.

Cleveland's Crooked River Skate Park was opened in 2015. The park occupies 15,000 square feet of city owned land. It is located alongside the Cuyahoga River and adjacent to the Cleveland Metroparks new Rivergate Park. The total cost was approximately $758,000. Groundbreaking occurred in July 2014.

=== Cleveland State University expansion ===
CSU's campus continues to undergo a $500 million expansion. Recently completed projects include a new Student Center ($55 million), Euclid Commons Dorms (5 buildings costing $60 million), "College Town" (373 new residential units), Middough Building ($20 million) and College of Education and Human Services Building ($37 million).

Upcoming projects include converting the Mather Mansion into a boutique hotel and the construction of a $45 million Center for Innovation in Health Professions.

One block north of campus along Chester Ave, the privately developed Langston Apartments will add over 300 apartments units. The $54 million project opened Phase I in 2012, with Phase II opening in 2013.

=== Completed projects ===
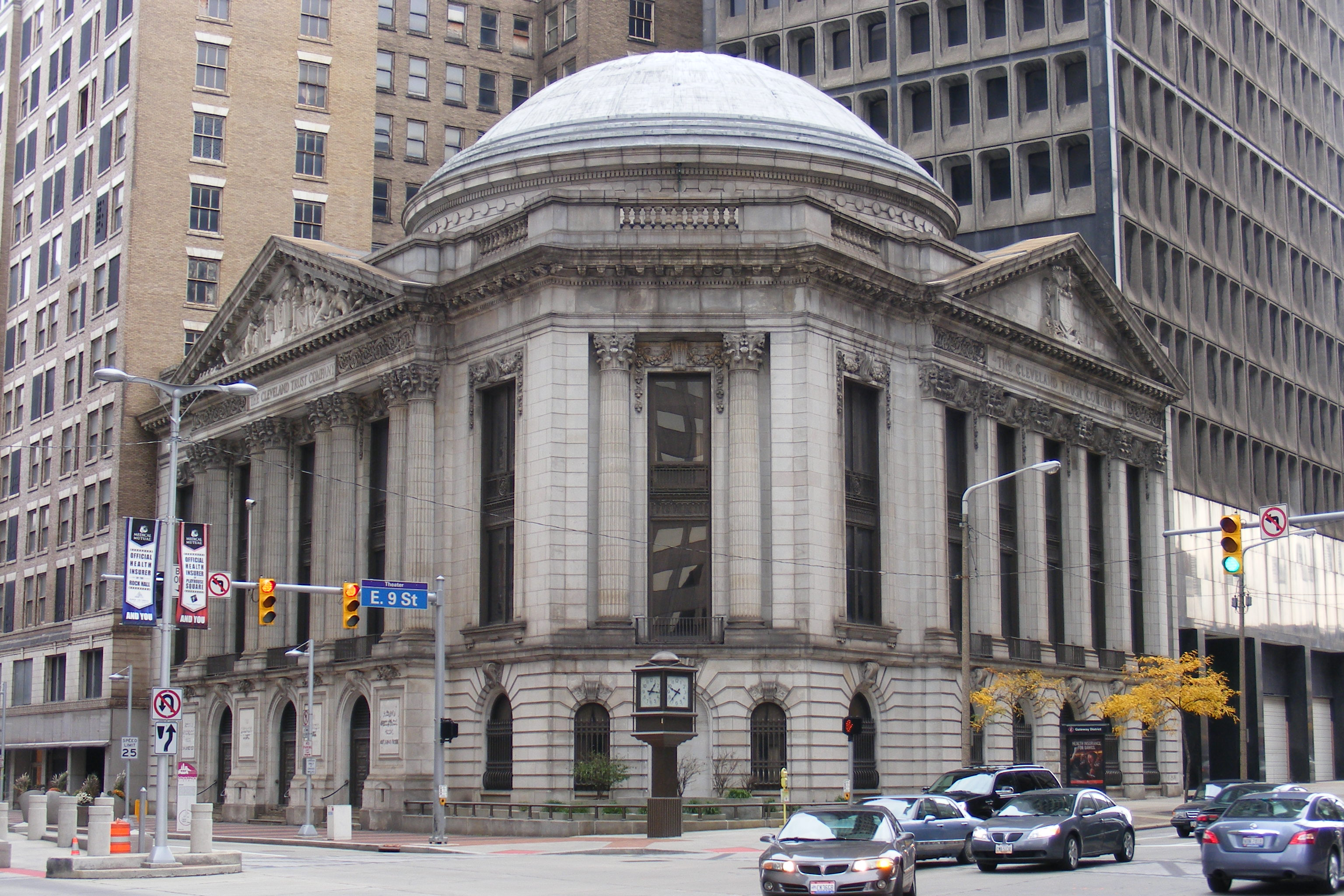
The corner of Euclid Ave. and East Ninth Street shows the Cleveland Trust Company Building, 1010 Euclid Ave., and the base the Ameritrust Tower

Relocation of the Cuyahoga County Administrative Headquarters, being developed by Geis Company, is spurring a $200 million mixed-use development at the corner of Euclid Avenue and East Ninth Street. The properties involved include the 29-story Ameritrust Tower, the attached 1010 Euclid Avenue building, the historic Cleveland Trust Company Building, and the so-called "P and H" buildings, located on the Prospect Avenue side of the complex. Additionally, two parking garages on the south side of Prospect Ave along East Ninth Street will anchor the parking aspect.

The P and H buildings will be razed and the site will become the home of a new, eight-story Cuyahoga County headquarters building, in which the county will lease for 26 years. Building size is expected to be 220,000 square feet.

The plan calls for creating 210 high-end apartments in the former office tower and part of the building at 1010 Euclid, although portions of the building will be retained as office space in case the county needs to expand in the future. Between 2015 and 2026, the Cleveland Trust Company Rotunda and 1010 Euclid Avenue ground floor housed a full-service Heinen's grocery store for downtown residents.

=== Residential developments ===
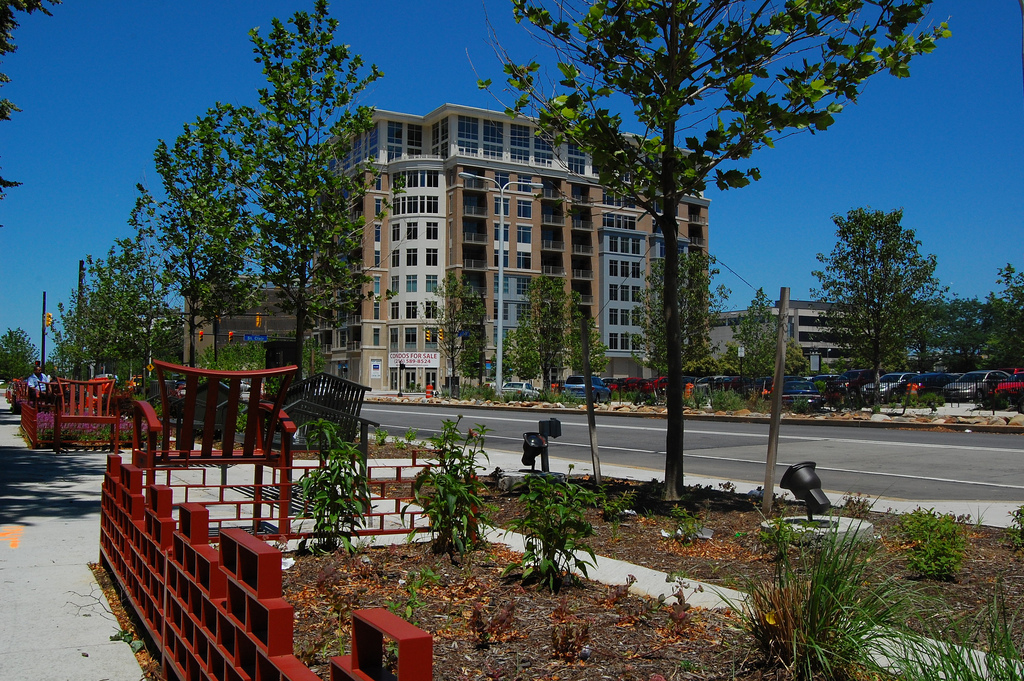
The Avenue District in June 2010

Downtown Cleveland had the largest percent population growth in the 2010 Census for the entire city of Cleveland. Conversion of old office space into residential is causing the population to continue to climb, along with some new construction—totaling over 1500 additional new units.

=== Hotels ===
Located in the east bank of the Flats, the 150-room Aloft Hotels-branded hotel opened in the summer 2013. The hotel is part of a $500 million mixed-used project known as the Flats East Bank. A $64 million renovation and new branding of the 484-room Westin Hotel was completed Spring 2014.

The 600-room Hilton Cleveland Downtown Hotel convention center hotel opened in June 2016. A $272 million project, the new construction of a 28-story tower atop a 4-story podium sits along the Mall next door to the Global Center for Health Innovation. Marriott is incorporating a 156-room Autograph Collection brand into the Ameritrust complex mixed-use design with an expected completion of 2015. Also expected to open 2015 and 2016 are the Schofield Building into a 122-room Kimpton hotel and the John Hartness Brown Building into a 206-room Le Meridien

The old Cleveland Municipal School District headquarters, built in the 1930s by Cleveland architectural firm Walker and Weeks, is being converted into a 175 to 180-room hotel by Drury Southwest Incorporated. The expected brand name is to be Drury Plaza with a projected 2016 completion date. Without a given timeframe, proposed is the Cleveland Athletic Club building conversion into a Crowne Plaza hotel.
