= Galleria at Erieview =

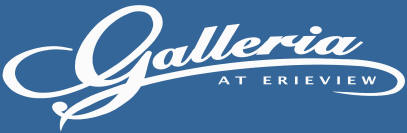
- Location: Cleveland, Ohio, United States
- Coordinates: 41°30′16.9″N 81°41′21.6″W
- Address: 1301 East Ninth Street
- Opened: 1987
- Developer: Richard E. Jacobs Group
- Owner: James Kassouf
- Num. of stores: 28
- Floor area: 138,000 square feet (12,800 m^{2})
- Floors: 2
- Public transit: RTA
- Website: galleriaandtower.com/home/galleria

The Galleria at Erieview is a two-floor shopping mall, located in Cleveland, Ohio in The United States. The Galleria was opened in 1987, notable for its position on the east side of the city's downtown.

== History ==
The Galleria was conceptualised in 1985 by businessman and real estate developer Richard E. Jacobs, who famously purchased the Cleveland Indians baseball team and the existing Tower at Erieview. Jacobs' planned to convert the Tower's surround plaza into a shopping centre which would serve the Cleveland area.

The resulting Galleria, a glass-enclosed 207,600-square-foot (19,290 m^{2}) mall, opened in late 1987. It was the first major retail venture in Downtown Cleveland since the 1920s. The Galleria was noted for the business "Gardens Under Glass", an urban farm beneath the mall's atrium.

In 2003, The Galleria and Tower at Erieview were purchased by Werner Minshall, who proposed closing the mall and converting it into a convention centre. When this development project did not eventuate, Minshall continued to lease tenant spaces to local retailers and vendors.

Although The Galleria represented a significant revitalisation of Cleveland's downtown district during the early 1990s, it suffered a decline in consumer popularity throughout the early 2000s. The Galleria failed to secure an anchoring department store, reliant on small business to support tenancy. By 2005, there were 36 active tenants out of a possible 66. In 2013, The Galleria's famed "Gardens Under Glass" closed.

In 2019, James Kassouf and a supporting group of investors purchased the property for $17.7 million. Currently, The Parker Hannifin Downtown YMCA occupies a considerable portion of the Galleria.
