= North Coast Harbor =

District in Cleveland, Ohio

Coordinates: 41°30′30″N 81°41′47″W

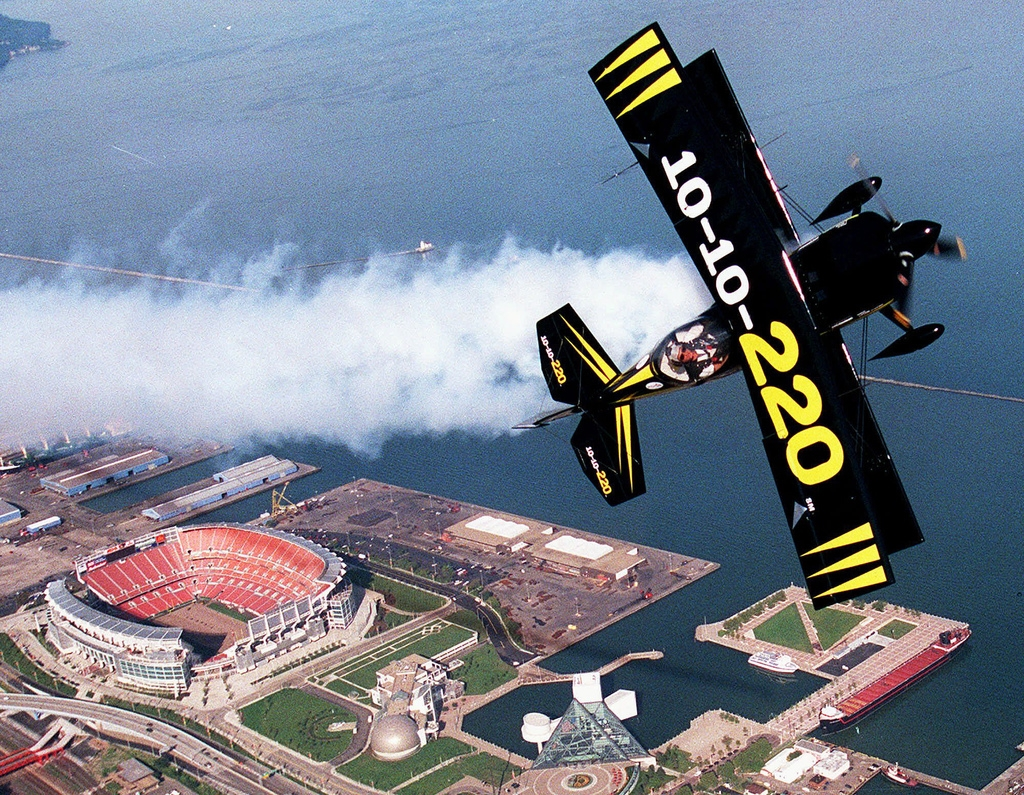
Sean D. Tucker flies over North Coast Harbor during the 1999 Cleveland National Air Show.

North Coast Harbor is a district in downtown Cleveland, Ohio, United States, on the shore of Lake Erie. The district serves as the home of the Great Lakes Science Center, the Rock and Roll Hall of Fame and Museum, Huntington Bank Field, the Steamship William G. Mather Maritime Museum, USS Cod, Burke Lakefront Airport, Voinovich Bicentennial Park, and the Cleveland-Cuyahoga County Port Authority. It is served by the West 3rd and North Coast stations on RTA's light rail Waterfront Line.

== Events ==
The harbor was the site of the Great Lakes Exposition, a historic event starting in 1936 that commemorated the centennial of Cleveland's incorporation as a city.

North Coast Harbor has been the home of multiple events over the years: Cleveland National Air Show, Ingenuity Festival, Cleveland Triathlon, Rock Your World with STEAM Family Festival, National Rib Burn Off, and the Rock'N'Roll Cleveland 1/2 Marathon.

In the summers of 2007 and 2008, the harbor hosted the AST Dew Tour's Right Guard Open. In the summers of 2010 and 2013, the Port Authority sponsored an event called Cleveland Tall Ships, which visits Cleveland's North Coast Harbor every 3 years and is presented by The Rotary Club of Cleveland.

== Development ==
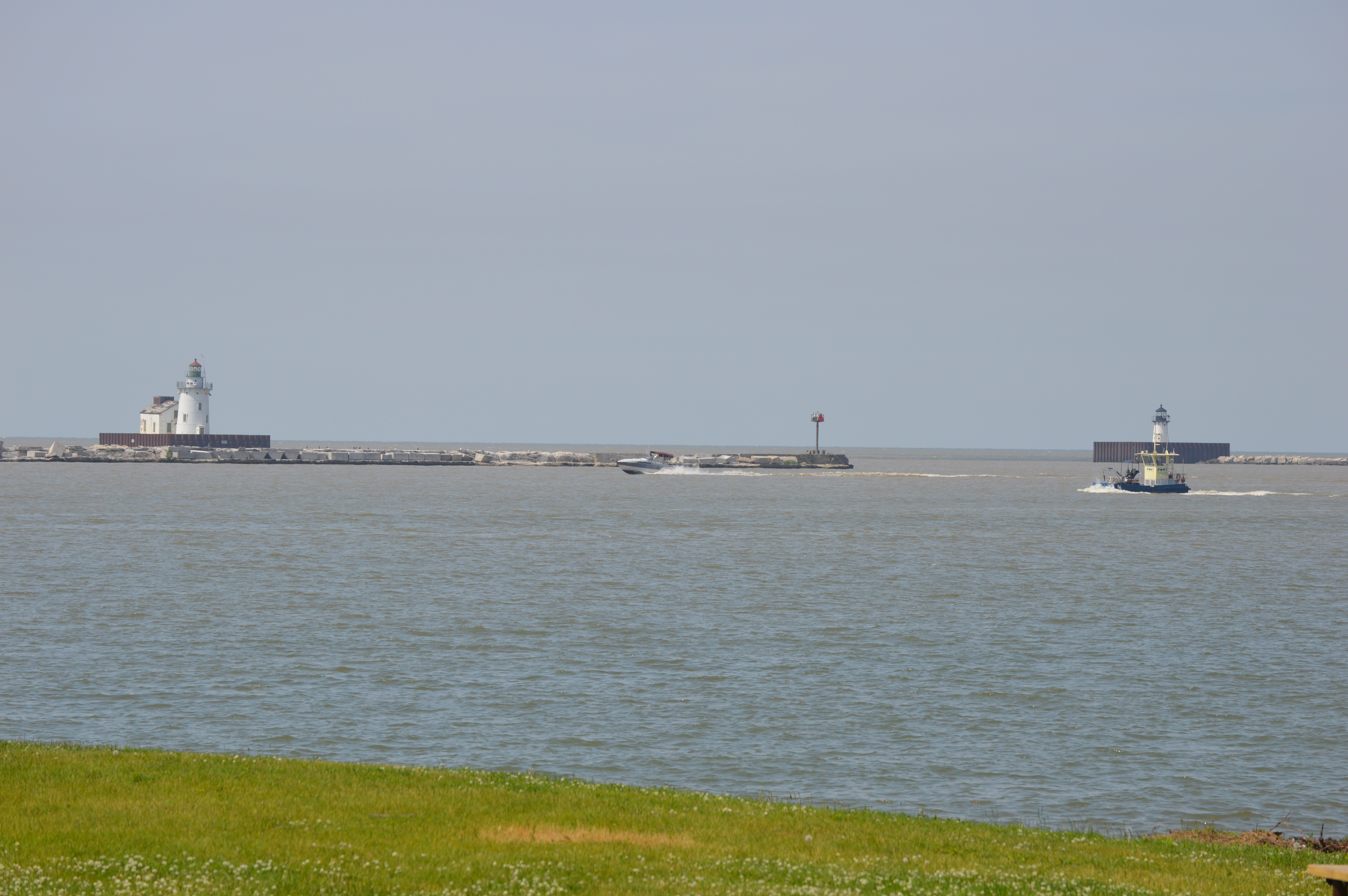
Boats in the harbor; the entrance is visible in the distance, between the lighthouses

As of 2012, the Cleveland Browns were spearheading development plans to construct an entertainment and commercial district in the area behind Huntington Bank Field (formerly First Energy Stadium) and the Great Lakes Science Center.

Randy Lerner, the former owner of the Browns, stated: "This is a unique opportunity for Cleveland to come together. We think the time has come to make the Lakefront a more dynamic and inviting area. We are very pleased to help with this concept, and we hope our interest attracts other private sector development geared toward making the Lakefront what it could and should be for the Cleveland community."

While the Browns aren't getting into the real estate business, they would like to stimulate private investment, "bridging a gulf that local governments and foundations aren't flush enough to fill." Cleveland politicians and planners have floated many ideas for lakefront development over the years, yet much of the city's downtown waterfront is undeveloped and inaccessible.

On March 19, 2012, Cleveland City Council approved key pieces of Mayor Frank Jackson's lakefront plan, a development plan to transform the waterfront by remaking the shoreline from the Cuyahoga River east across Burke Lakefront Airport, while building on existing attractions, such as the East Ninth Street pier, the Rock and Roll Hall of Fame and Museum, the Great Lakes Science Center and Huntington Bank Field. Architectural drawings include shops, restaurants, offices and a hotel tied together by walking and bicycle paths. The Rock & Dock at the North Coast Harbor Transient Marina in Downtown Cleveland opened behind the Rock and Roll Hall of Fame and Museum in June 2014.

A Coast Guard administrative building opened in 2012.

Two projects completed in 2013 include a 53 - ship marina along the East Ninth Street pier and a $5.5 million Miguel Rosales-designed pedestrian bridge connecting Voinovich Bicentennial Park to the west end of the North Coast Harbor Walkway.

In 2014, Cumberland Development, LLC and Trammel Crow Company were selected by City of Cleveland to develop 20+ acres surrounding Cleveland's North Coast Harbor. Phase 1; a restaurant on E9th pier was complete July 2016. Ground breaking for Phase 2; multi-use space located in the former skate park just north of the Rock & Roll Hall of Fame was scheduled for 2017.

The development was never completed as originally planned. A revised development is planned, including a new stadium and entertainment district in Brook Park by 2029.
