= Erieview Tower =

Skyscraper in Cleveland, Ohio

Coordinates: 41°30′19″N 81°41′18″W

Tower at Erieview
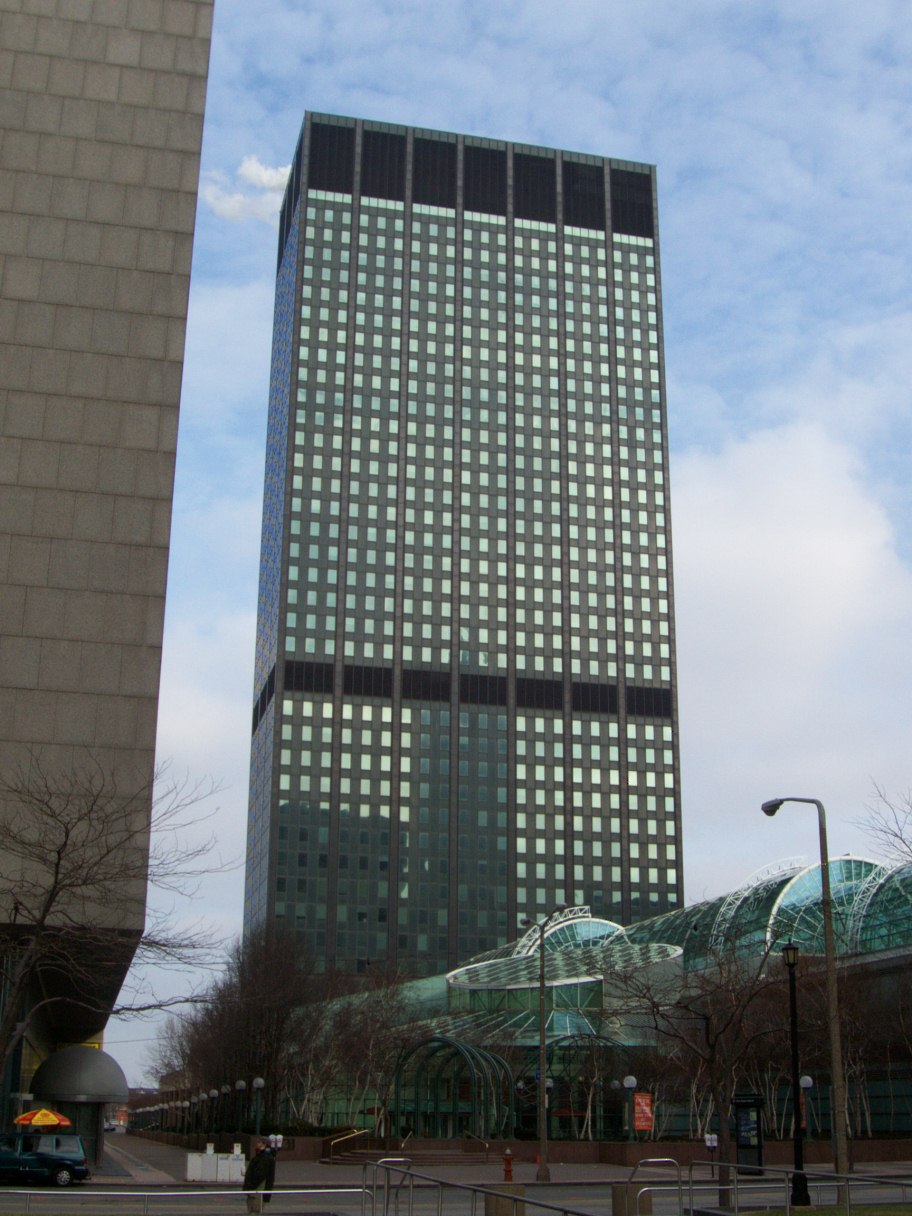
- The Erieview Tower, with the Galleria visible in the foreground
- Interactive map of the Tower at Erieview area
- Former names: Erieview Plaza Tower

General information
- Type: Office
- Location: 100 Erieview Plaza Cleveland, Ohio 44114 United States
- Construction started: 1963
- Completed: 1964

Height
- Roof: 161.23 m (529.0 ft)

Technical details
- Floor count: 40
- Floor area: 703,000 sq. ft.
- Lifts/elevators: 19

Design and construction
- Architects: Harrison & Abramovitz
- Structural engineer: Edwards & Hjorth
- Main contractor: Turner Construction Company

The Erieview Tower (also known as the Tower at Erieview, 100 Erieview, or the Erieview Plaza Tower) is a skyscraper featuring elements of the International style located in downtown Cleveland, Ohio, United States. The building has 40 stories, rises to a height of 529 ft (161 m), and has 703,000 square feet (65,300 m^{2}) of office space. It was built at a cost of $24,000,000. It is slated to become the Cleveland W Hotel.

== Design ==
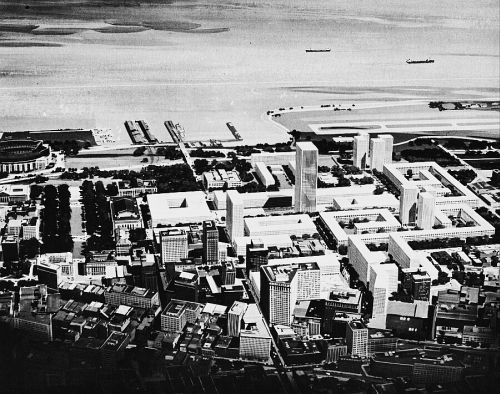
The original Erieview urban renewal plan

The tower was the first building erected as part of the Erieview urban renewal project initiated during the administration of Mayor Anthony J. Celebrezze in late 1960. The project was conceived as a 163-acre (66 hectare) mixed-use urban renewal area spanning from East 6th to East 17th Streets between Chester Avenue and Lake Erie. Architect I. M. Pei authored a master plan which featured groups of low-rise buildings contrasted with taller towers. Erieview Tower was to serve as the hub of the project and was to feature a plaza and reflecting pool in the area stretching from the tower west to East 9th Street.

Developers John Galbreath and Peter Ruffin broke ground on Harrison & Abramovitz's modernist skyscraper in early 1963. Construction went swiftly on the dark-green-and-black wall structure and a massive tree-lined plaza with combined fountain/reflecting pool/ice rink, linking it to East 9th Street.

The tower, with its underground 450 car parking garage, was completed in 1964 and although the full renewal plan was not fully implemented, significant progress was made over the course of the following twenty-five years. Much of the area was cleared for redevelopment and a number of other buildings were constructed A large amount of land was relegated to surface parking and, for a time into the late 1970s, the area became a somewhat cold and foreboding place to be with the East 9th Street corridor a limit to downtown's growth.

== History ==
During the mayoral administration of George Voinovich in the early 1980s, several new structures were built flanking the tower along East 9th Street. In 1987, The Galleria at Erieview, a two-level shopping mall was built on the former Plaza by the Richard E. Jacobs Group. The structure stretches from the tower's lobby to its arched entrance at East 9th Street. From 1964 until it closed in 1995, the tower's 38th floor was home to the Stouffer's Top of the Town restaurant which offered diners a view of Cleveland's skyline.

In 2003, Minshall-Stewart Properties acquired Erieview Tower and the Galleria.

In 2007, the Avenue District began construction, which will eventually become an entire neighborhood, bordering the east side of the tower. Additionally, this project will sit on the space formerly zoned for the Erieview masterplan. Also in 2007, The Tackle the Tower race which is held yearly at the Terminal Tower was moved to Erieview Tower due to renovations at the Terminal Tower. Erieview Tower has 646-steps. On February 9, 2008, the Tackle The Tower was again held at Erieview Tower. It has since moved back to the Terminal.

The tower was listed on the National Register of Historic Places in 2017. In 2021, it was named a Cleveland City Landmark by the Cleveland Landmarks Commission.

== See also ==
- List of tallest buildings in Cleveland
