= Great Lakes Science Center =

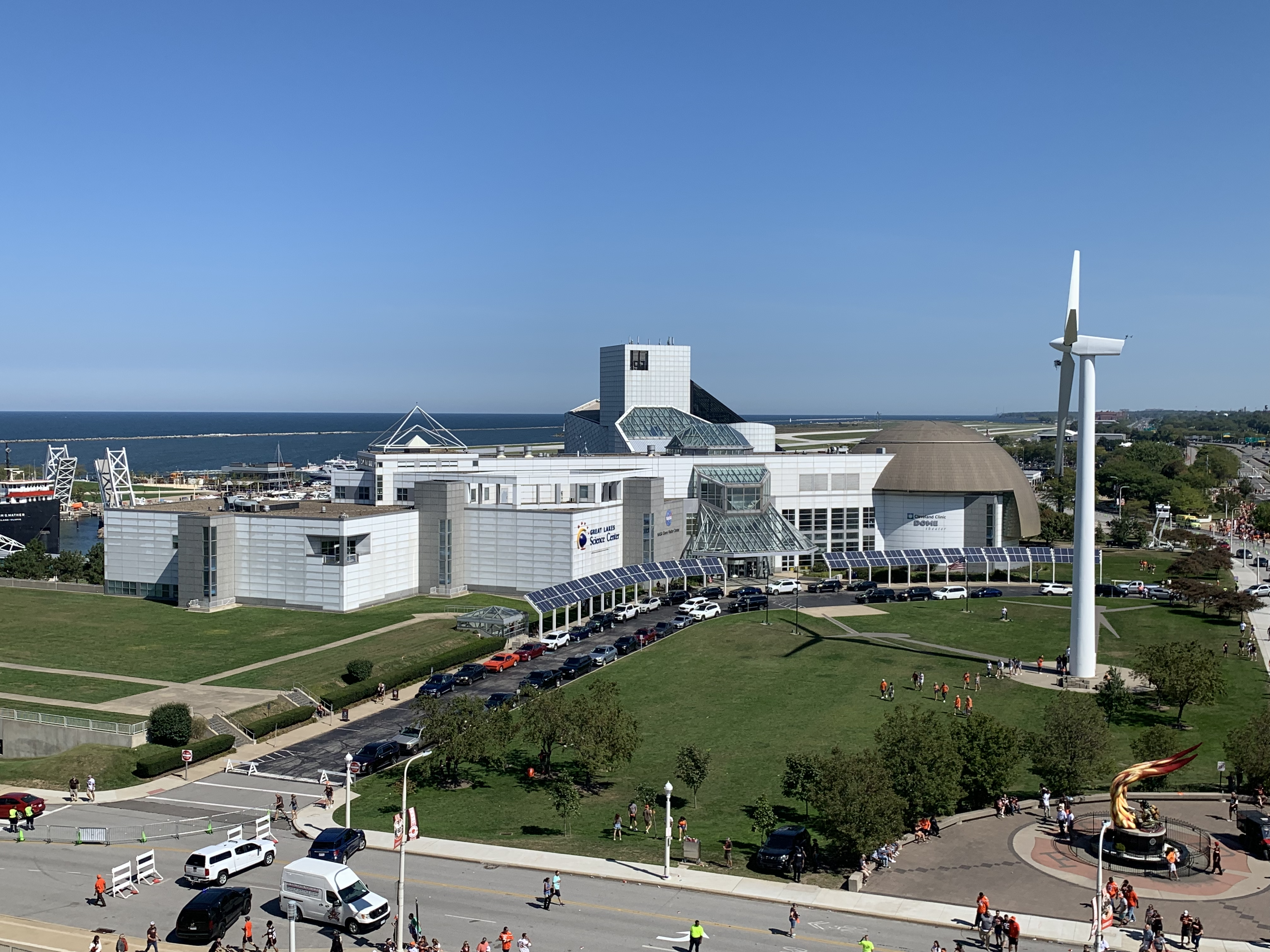
- The Great Lakes Science Center is located at North Coast Harbor in Downtown Cleveland.

- Location within Northeast Ohio Great Lakes Science Center (Ohio) Great Lakes Science Center (the United States)
- Established: 1996
- Location: 601 Erieside Ave, Cleveland, Ohio 44114
- Coordinates: 41°30′27″N 81°41′48″W
- Type: Science museum
- President: Kirsten M. Ellenbogen
- Public transit access: East 9th–North Coast
- Website: http://greatscience.com/

The Great Lakes Science Center is a museum and educational facility in downtown Cleveland, Ohio, United States. The center's exhibits focus on STEM (science, technology, engineering, math) concepts. Opening in July 1996, the facility includes signature (permanent) and traveling exhibits, meeting space, a cafe, and the Cleveland Clinic Dome Theater. Science center staff conduct daily science demonstrations. The Science Center is also home to the NASA Glenn Visitor Center, one of only 11 such Visitor Centers in the country.

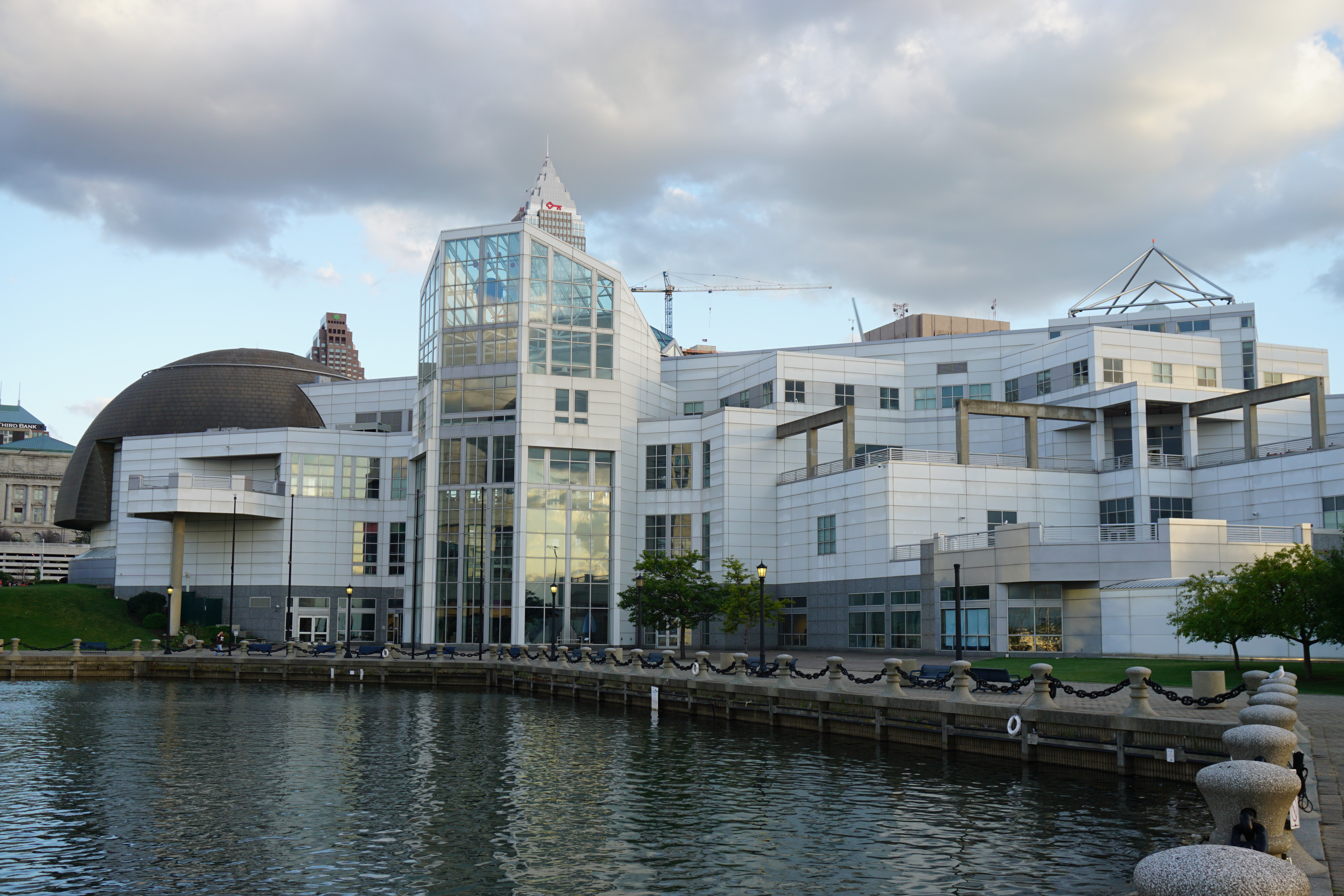
The Great Lakes Science Center as viewed from the marina

Throughout the school year, the Science Center provides STEM education to field trip students each year with programs and exhibits supporting classroom curriculum by meeting Ohio Revised Standards in Science.

Great Lakes Science Center is partially funded by the citizens of Cuyahoga County through Cuyahoga Arts and Culture, grants, funds, and corporate and individual gifts.

Throughout the school year, the Science Center provides STEM education to field trip students each year with programs and exhibits supporting classroom curriculum by meeting Ohio Revised Standards in Science. During the summer and winter school breaks, the Science Center hosts Camp Curiosity, educational and fun camps for children in grades K-6. through 12th graders that occur in various locations throughout Northeast Ohio.

The Great Lakes Science Center is located between Huntington Bank Field and the Rock and Roll Hall of Fame at North Coast Harbor on the shore of Lake Erie. Discounted parking is available for guests in the attached 500-car garage.

== NASA Glenn Visitor Center ==
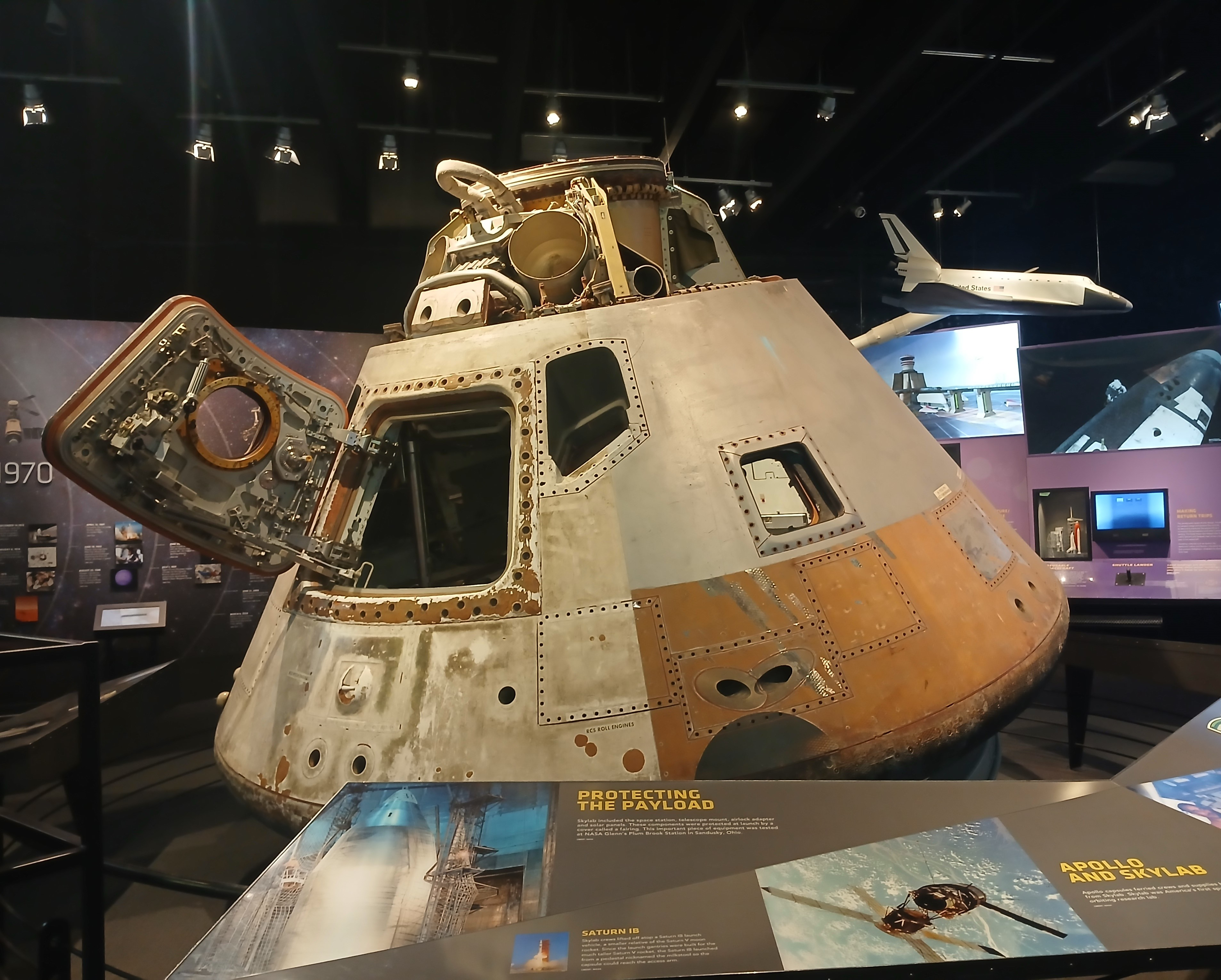
The Apollo Command Module, which was used for the Skylab 3 mission in 1973, in the NASA Glenn Visitor Center at Great Lakes Science Center.

Previously located at the NASA Glenn Research Center located on Cleveland's south side, the NASA Glenn Visitor Center began to relocate within the Great Lakes Science Center in early 2010. Admittance is included with the Science Center's general admission.

The NASA Glenn Visitor Center offers galleries, interactive exhibits, artifacts and NASA media focused on living in space, space exploration, and the underlying science and engineering principles that make space exploration possible. Admission to Great Lakes Science Center includes the NASA Glenn Visitor Center.

== Cleveland Creates Gallery ==
In February 2024, the Science Center opened the Cleveland Creates Gallery, a new permanent exhibit focused on the Northeast Ohio's contributions to manufacturing technology. Interactive exhibits in the gallery highlight technological advances in the fields of aeronautics, robotics, steel and chemistry developed locally "meant to inspire the next generation of innovators to pursue STEM careers in Cleveland."

== Handle With care ==
On September 30, 2025 the Science Center opened a new hands-on gallery aimed at children 8 and under with a focus on STEM learning. Children can assemble packages for a loved one, operate a scale-model forklift to move them through a three-story climbing structure, and deliver the packages to a pretend neighborhood.

== DOME Theater ==
The Great Lakes Science Center also holds the DOME Theater. The theater, called "The Cleveland Clinic DOME Theater," originally used IMAX technology, but was updated in 2016 to a "three projector, laser-illuminated projection system," the first of its kind. The theater is 79 feet tall and seats 300 people. There is a separate admission fee.

== Steamship William G. Mather ==
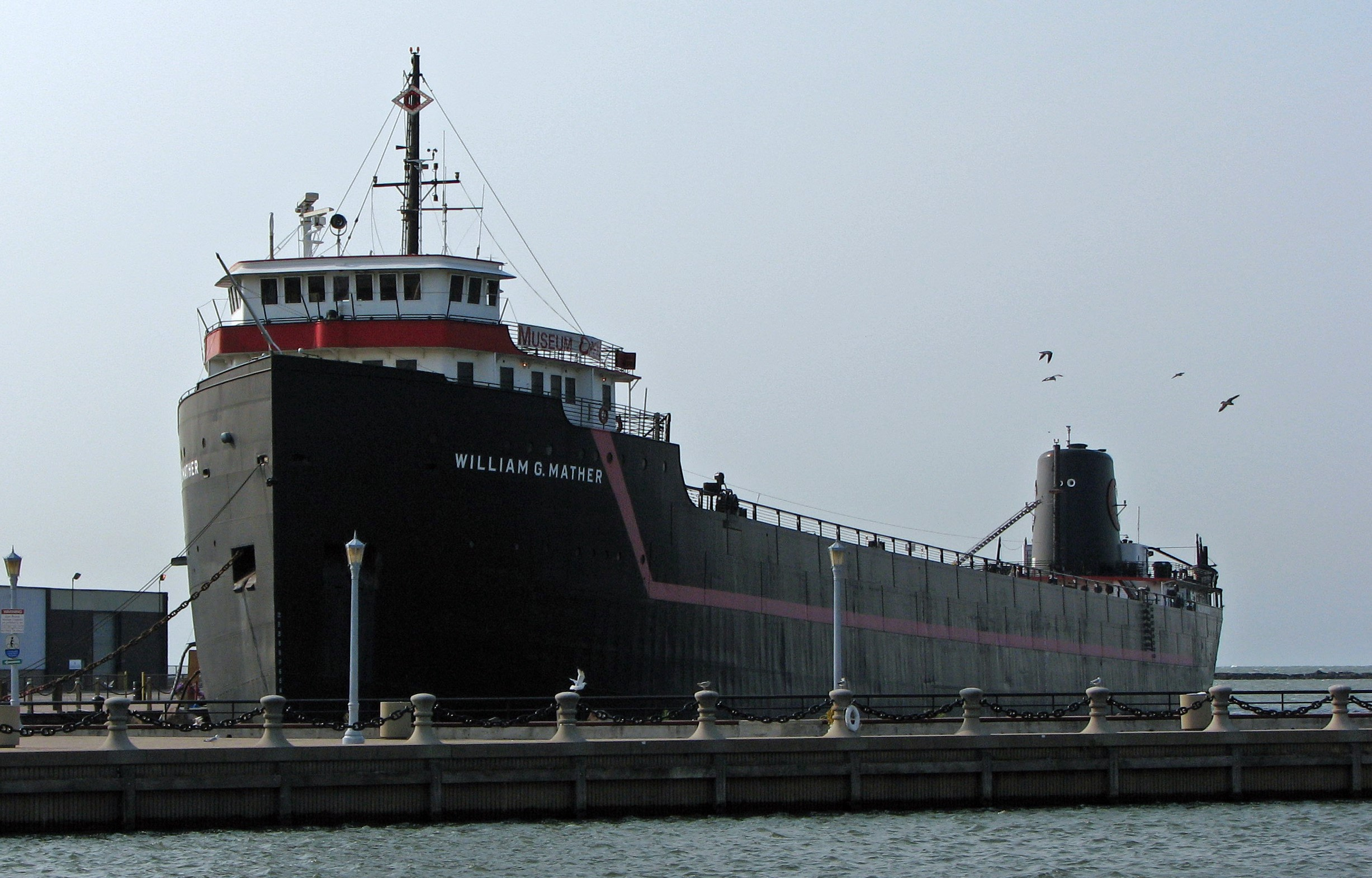
Steamship William G. Mather

The 1925-built Steamship Mather is a restored 618-foot historic Great Lakes freighter. The flagship has huge cargo holds, brass and oak pilot house, guest quarters, and four-story engine room. There is a separate admission fee. The Mather – commonly referred to as "The Ship That Built Cleveland" – is open to the public seasonally from May to October.

== MC2 STEM High School ==
MC2 STEM High School is the result of an innovative partnership between the Cleveland Metropolitan School District (CMSD) and the Science Center. Focusing on STEM education (science, technology, engineering and math), the school furthers the mission of both organizations and makes science education come alive.

Designed as a project-based learning environment, the MC2 STEM High School exposes students to the design and implementation practices scientists and engineers use.

The partnership also includes the sponsorship of six competitive robotics teams.

School is in session year-round, with students working for 10 weeks, taking a three-week break and then repeating that pattern for four 10-week terms throughout the year.

== Cleveland Water Alliance ==
The Cleveland Water Alliance is a network of corporations, academic institutions, and public agencies across Northeast Ohio with a common goal: address the issues of water quality and water access that are critical for life on our planet. The Alliance creates conversations and connections to bring attention to these critical issues and develop an economy in Northeast Ohio around their solutions. Working with its partners and collaborators, the Alliance is coordinating a community-wide effort to improve water quality and access. Great Lakes Science Center is a founding Partner of the Alliance. Dr. Kirsten Ellenbogen, also serves as Board Chair for the Cleveland Water Alliance.

== Science Phenomena ==
Science Phenomena is a permanent exhibition of more than 100 hands-on experiences within the Great Lakes Science Center. Exhibition stations there explore topics such as plasma, magnetism, and chaos theory.

== See also ==
- Wind power in Ohio
