= SS William G. Mather (1925) =

Museum ship in Cleveland, Ohio

Coordinates: 41.50931°N 81.69808°W

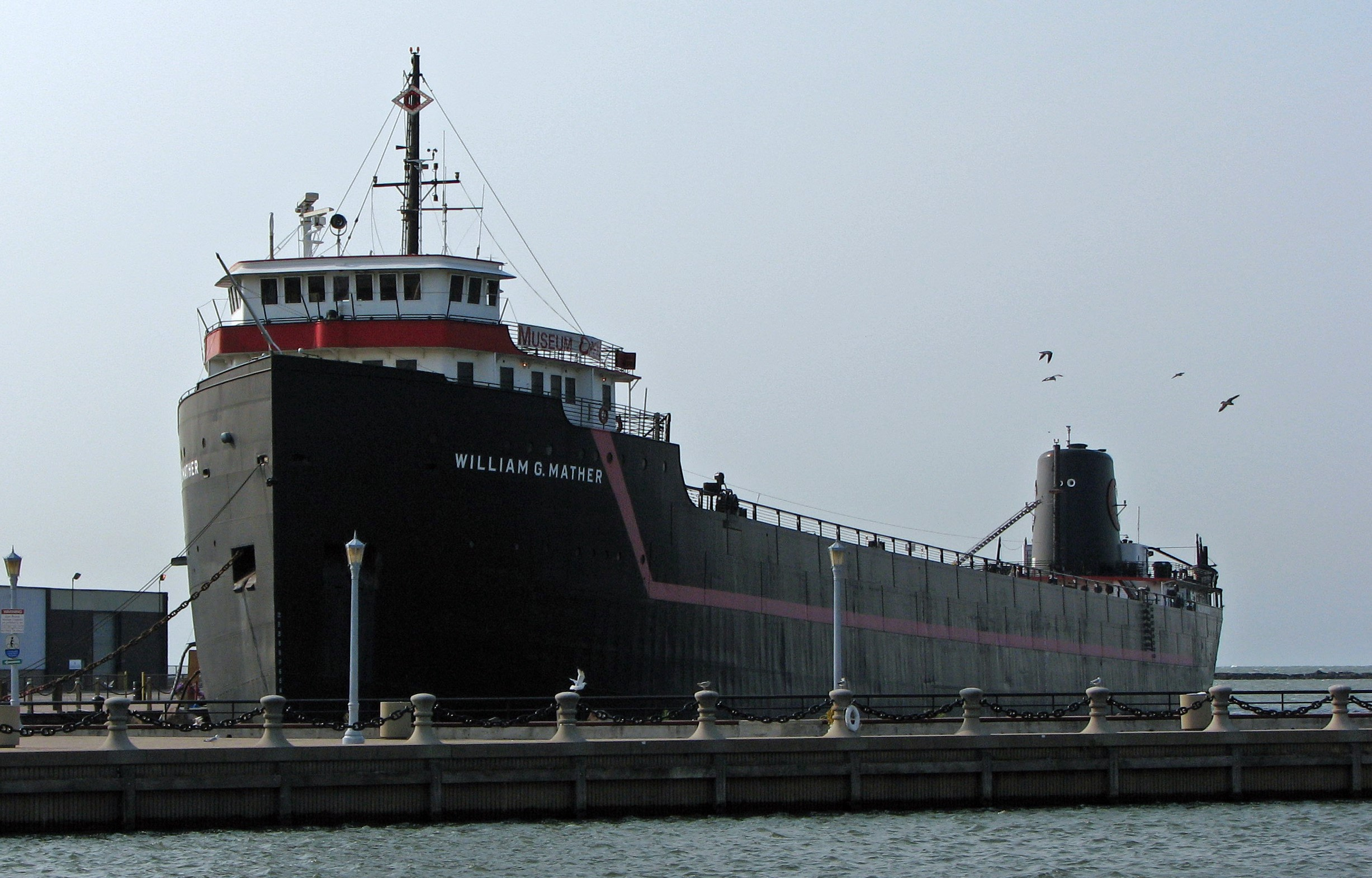
- SS William G. Mather at Dock 32, Cleveland, Ohio in 2006

History

United States
- Name: SS William G. Mather
- Namesake: William G. Mather
- Owner: Cleveland-Cliffs Iron Company
- Operator: Cleveland-Cliffs Iron Company
- Port of registry: Cleveland, Ohio
- Builder: Great Lakes Engineering Works, Ecorse, Michigan
- Launched: May 23, 1925
- In service: 1925
- Out of service: 1980
- Identification: IMO number: 5390577
- Status: Museum ship

General characteristics
- Type: Lake freighter
- Tonnage: 8,662 GRT
- Length: 618 ft (188 m)
- Beam: 62 ft (19 m)
- Draft: 32 ft 10 in (10.01 m)
- Propulsion: Coal-fired quadruple expansion steam engine (1925); DeLaval oil-fired steam turbine (1954); 5,000 shp (3,728 kW)
- Capacity: 14,000 tonnes of cargo
- Crew: 37 (1925–1964); 29 (1965–1980)

The SS William G. Mather (Official Number 224850) is a retired Great Lakes bulk freighter now restored as a museum ship in Cleveland, Ohio, one of five such ships in the Great Lakes region. She transported cargo such as ore, coal, stone, and grain to ports throughout the Great Lakes, and was nicknamed "The Ship That Built Cleveland" because Cleveland's steel mills were a frequent destination. (Note: From 1905 till 1925 the Cleveland-Cliffs Iron Company had another vessel named SS William G. Mather (O.N. 202542) in their fleet, also built by Great Lakes Engineering Works. This former SS William G. Mather was renamed SS J. H. Sheadle in 1925, and SS H. L. Gobeille in 1955. After she had been sold to Gartland Steamship Co. she was renamed SS Nicolet in 1965.)

== History ==
It was built in 1925 by Great Lakes Engineering Works, Ecorse, Michigan, as the flagship for Cleveland-Cliffs and was named in honor of the then-company president, William Gwinn Mather. SS William G. Mather remained the Cliffs' flagship until SS Edward B. Greene (now MV Kaye E. Barker of the Interlake Steamship Company fleet) was built in 1951–52. It remained an active part of the Cliffs' fleet until the end of the 1980 navigation season.

In order to supply the Allied Forces need for steel during World War II, SS William G. Mather led a convoy of 13 freighters in early 1941 through the ice-choked Upper Great Lakes to Duluth, Minnesota, setting a record for the first arrival in a northern port. This effort was featured in the April 28, 1941 issue of Life. It was one of the first commercial Great Lakes vessels to be equipped with radar, which was installed in 1946. In 1964, it became the first American vessel to have an automated boiler system, manufactured by Bailey Controls of Cleveland.

In 1985, Cleveland-Cliffs sold its two remaining operating steamers to Rouge Steel Company, and gradually sold off its idle vessels until only SS William G. Mather remained, laid up in Toledo, Ohio where she had been since 1980. On December 10, 1987, Cleveland-Cliffs, Inc. donated the steamer SS William G. Mather to the Great Lakes Historical Society to be restored and preserved as a museum ship and floating maritime museum. After it was brought to Cleveland in October 1988 and funding was acquired from local foundations, corporations, and individuals, restoration began. Fire damage to SS William G. Mather's galley and after cabin spaces required a major restoration effort. All over the vessel, most of the work was supplied by volunteers who repaired, cleaned, chipped, painted, and polished brass in order to restore SS William G. Mather's former elegance. In October 1990, it was moved to the East Ninth Street Pier on Cleveland's North Coast Harbor.

In September 1994 the Great Lakes Historical Society divested itself of the museum. Due in large part to a groundswell of local support to keep the Mather in Cleveland, the Harbor Heritage Society was created to negotiate a new lease agreement with the city. Incorporated in June 1995, Harbor Heritage formally acquired SS William G. Mather on July 22, 1995, and in 1996 continued to oversee SS William G. Mather's ongoing restoration, promotion, and development as a historic vessel. After ten years of negotiations, the City of Cleveland, represented by Mayor Jane L. Campbell signed a 40-year lease on June 15, 2003, allowing SS William G. Mather to stay at its East 9th Street berth.

On July 30, 1995 the steamship SS William G. Mather was dedicated as an American Society of Mechanical Engineers National Historic Mechanical Engineering Landmark for its 1954 installation of a single marine boiler and steam turbine engine, its 1964 installation of the Bailey 760 Boiler Control System and American Shipbuilding AmThrust dual propeller bow thruster—all firsts for U.S.-flagged Great Lakes vessels. It had a sister ship of the same class, SS Joseph H. Frantz, which was later converted to diesel, and was scrapped in 2005 after 80 years of continuous use.

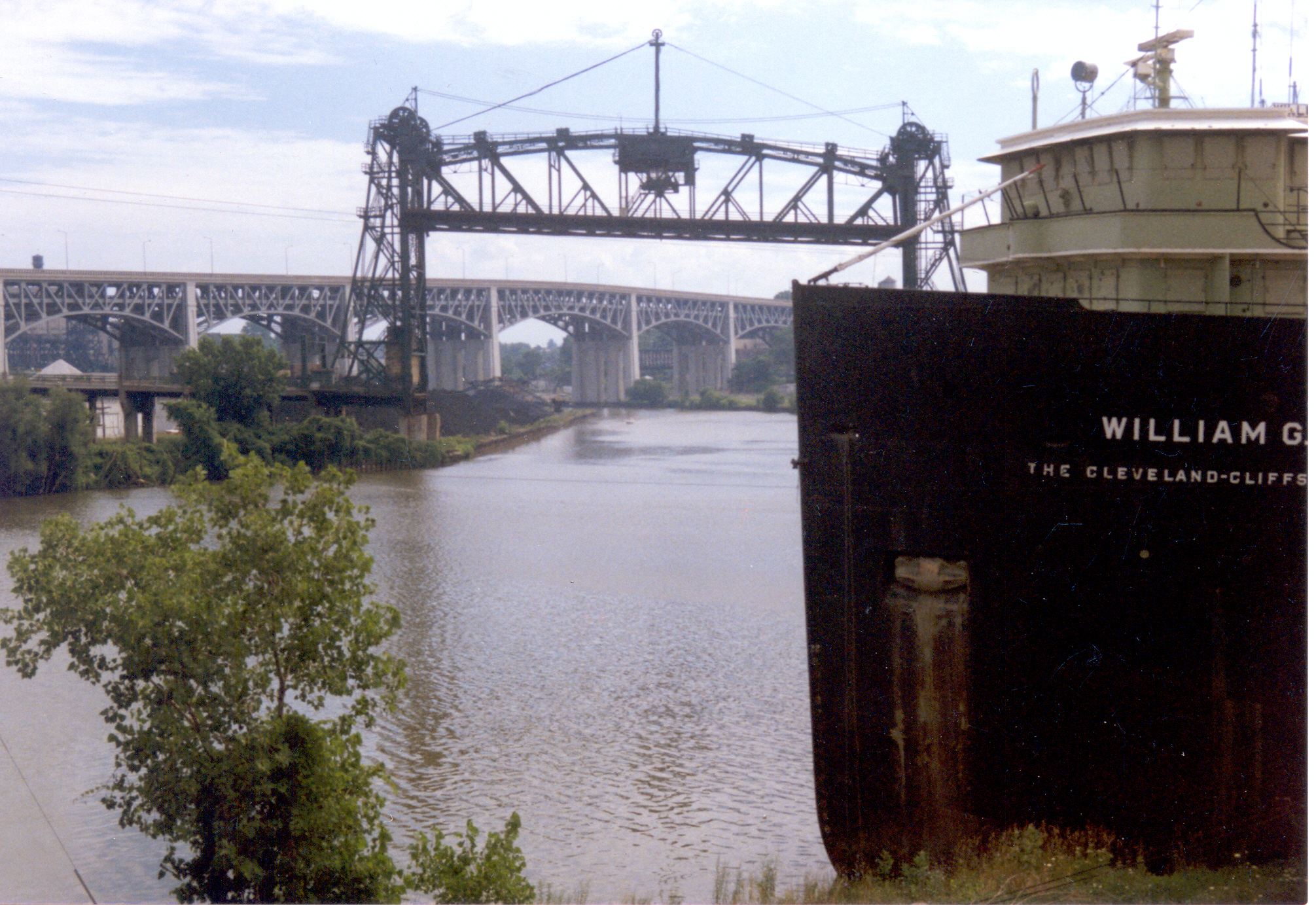
SS William G. Mather at collision bend, in her Cleveland Cliffs livery

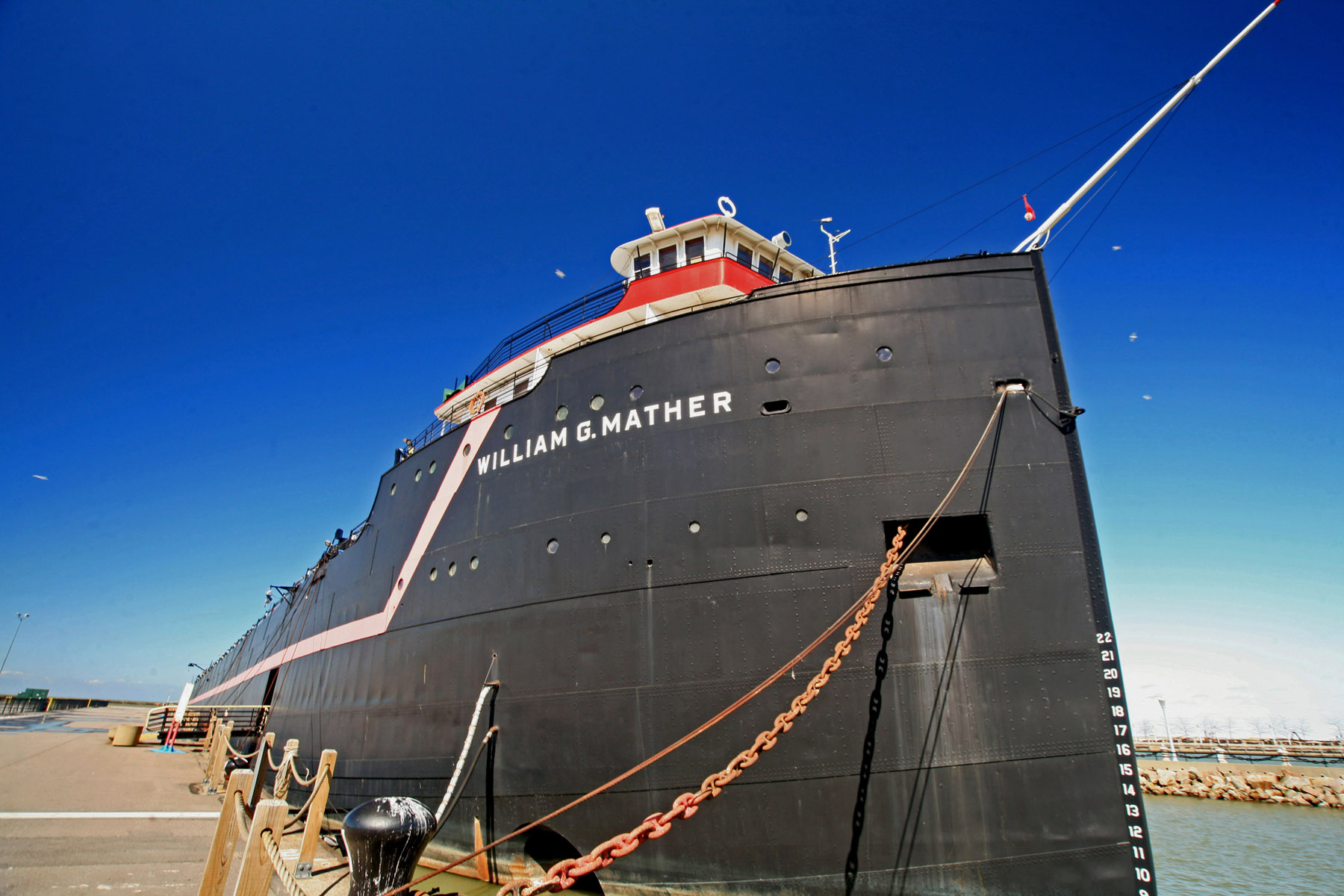
View of the forward structure and pilothouse

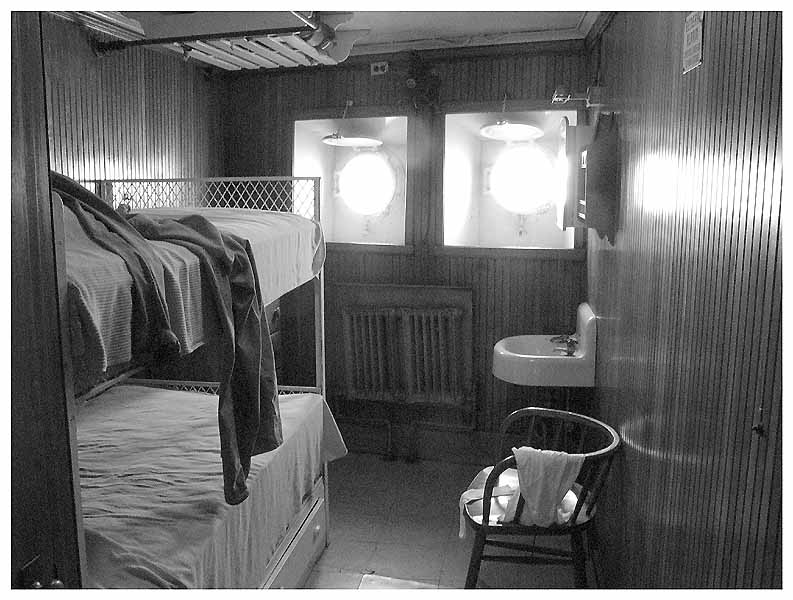
Interior view of cabin aboard SS William G. Mather Maritime Museum

== Current location ==
On September 24, 2005, the museum was moved from the East Ninth Street Pier to Dock 32, just west of the East Ninth Street Pier, closer to the Great Lakes Science Center and the Rock and Roll Hall of Fame.

In October 2006, SS William G. Mather was acquired by the Great Lakes Science Center. Today, the ship is a focal point for interpreting the relationship between technology, history, commerce, and the environment.

== See also ==
- William Gwinn Mather
- SS William G. Mather (1905)
- SS Col. James M. Schoonmaker known as the SS Willis B. Boyer during its time in the Cleveland-Cliffs Fleet. The Mather's fleet mate at one time, now a museum ship in Toledo, Ohio
