= Walter H. Cottingham =

Canadian businessman (1866–1930)

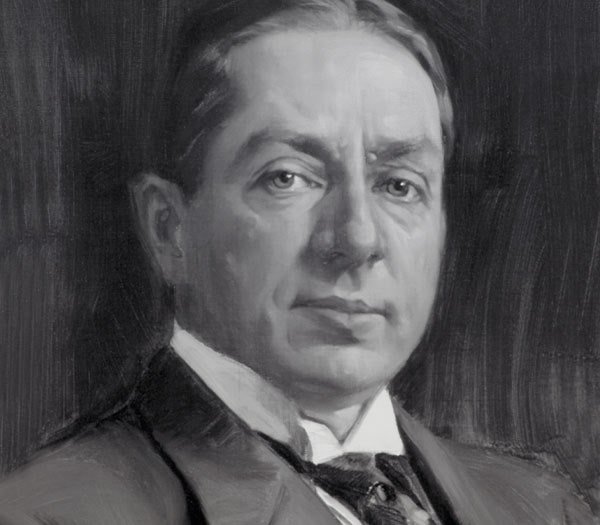
- Born: Walter Horace Cottingham; January 8, 1866; Omemee, Canada West
- Died: January 8, 1930 (aged 64); Berkshire, England
- Resting place: Lake View Cemetery, Cleveland, Ohio
- Occupation: Businessman
- Known for: Second president of Sherwin-Williams Company
- Spouse: Gertrude Bennett
- Children: 4

Walter Horace Cottingham (8 January 1866 – 12 March 1930) was a Canadian businessman. Cottingham help lead the global expansion of the Sherwin-Williams Company. As the second president and later chairman of the board, Cottingham spearheaded the company’s growth from 1909 to 1930, transforming it into a global powerhouse in the paint and coatings industry.

Beyond Sherwin-Williams, Cottingham also owned and chaired Lewis Berger & Sons, a major player in the paint and coatings sector. He served as a director for several notable companies, including the Cleveland Box Co., Ozark Smelting Co., and the Cleveland Trust Company.

== Early life ==
Walter Horace Cottingham was born on 8 January 1866 in Omemee, Canada West to an English father and an Irish mother. Tragedy struck early in his life when his mother died when he was six, followed by his father’s death two years later. Orphaned, Cottingham was raised by his sister and attended local public schools.

At the age of 15, Cottingham began working as a clerk in a hardware store in Peterborough, Ontario A year later, he relocated to Montreal where he gained experience in a hardware and paint store over the next four years.

== Career ==
At just 21 years old, Cottingham purchased a formula for gold paint for $25 and launched his own business manufacturing gold paints. In 1891, he officially organized this venture as Walter H. Cottingham & Company. A year later, in 1892, Cottingham became the Canadian agent for Sherwin-Williams & Company, leading to the formation of Walter H. Cottingham Co., which manufactured Sherwin-Williams products in Canada.

By 1896, Cottingham orchestrated a merger between his company and Sherwin-Williams & Company. He joined Sherwin-Williams’ board of directors and became the manager of its Canadian operations. In 1898, Cottingham was brought to Cleveland by Henry Sherwin and Edward Williams to serve as the company’s general manager. By 1903, he was named vice president.

In 1909, Cottingham succeeded Henry Sherwin as the second president of Sherwin-Williams. Under his leadership, the company experienced extraordinary growth, with revenues skyrocketing from $2.3 million to $34.2 million. In 1917, the company acquired the Chicago-based Martin-Senour Company. In 1920, Sherwin-Williams went public, raising $15 million through the sale of preferred shares, which financed major acquisitions and expansions, including the Detroit-based Acme Quality Paint Company, as well as a new manufacturing campus in Oakland, California.

He contributed to Sherwin-Williams on the invention of the iconic "Cover the Earth" logo, first introduced under his leadership in 1905. Featuring a paint can pouring red paint over the globe, the logo was meant to symbolize the company’s ambition for global expansion.

Cottingham was celebrated for his motivational leadership style and skill as an orator, and he reportedly encouraged his employees to reach their full potential. He was considered a skilled marketer and communicator, with a record of launching successful sales campaigns and publishing "inspirational" writings and editorials.

In 1922, Cottingham transitioned from president to chairman of the board. He moved to his estate, Wooley Hall, in Maidenhead, England where he oversaw his business interests, including Lewis Berger & Sons.

== Personal life ==
On May 22, 1888, Cottingham married Gertrude Bennett and they had four children: Gladys, Gertrude, Sherwin (who later married Maggie Teyte), and William.

== Death and legacy ==
Walter Horace Cottingham died on 12 March 1930 in Berkshire, England. He was interred at Lake View Cemetery in Cleveland, Ohio.

Cottingham’s contributions to Sherwin-Williams and the paint industry at large are remembered as a cornerstone of its success. His introduction of the "Cover the Earth" logo remains an iconic symbol of the company.
