= Charles Tudor Williams =

American businessman, author, composer, linguist, and educator

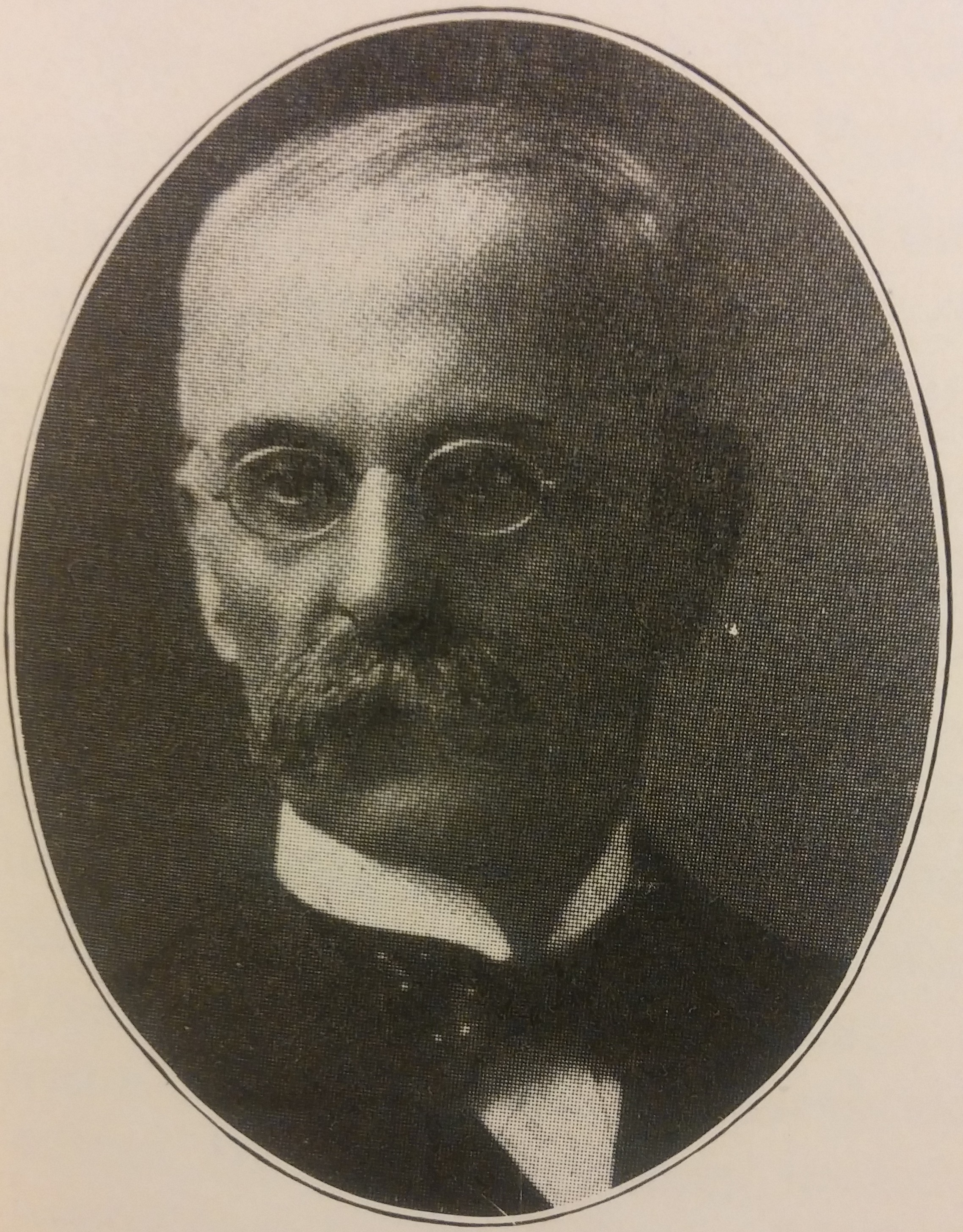
- Born: April 13, 1839; Cleveland, Ohio, US
- Died: January 7, 1914 (aged 74); Cleveland, Ohio, US
- Education: Cleveland Central High School; Western Reserve College; Cleveland Medical School
- Occupations: Businessman; businessman
- Spouses: Mary Priscilla Carver (m. 1866–1896) Mari Carlson (m. 1907–1914)
- Children: Dr. William Carver Williams; Day Williams
- Parent(s): William Williams; Laura Fitch

Charles Tudor Williams (April 13, 1839 – January 7, 1914) was an American businessman, author, composer, linguist, and educator. He was an older brother to Edward Porter Williams, (co-founder of the Sherwin-Williams Company), and uncle of pioneering American Neurosurgeon Dr. Harvey Williams Cushing.

== Biography ==
Charles was born in Cleveland to William and Laura Fitch Williams, the sixth of William's 10 children, and Laura's fourth child.

His father William migrated to what was then known as the "Western Reserve" with his parents in 1811, on his 8th birthday. Laura was the daughter of Zalmon Fitch. Zalmon served as President of Western Reserve Bank and Bank of Cleveland and was the founder and president of the Cleveland & Pittsburg Railroad, later merged with the Pennsylvania Railroad.

Charles attended Cleveland Central High School, the first free public high school West of the Allegheny Mountains, and was a classmate of John D. Rockefeller. He completed his college education at Western Reserve College (now Case Western Reserve University) in 1861 and also studied at Cleveland Medical College (also now part of Case Western Reserve University). He then returned to Western Reserve College as a tutor. In 1862, the entire college, including professors, responded to the call for troops to serve in the civil war. Charles enlisted for three months in the Eighty-Fifth Ohio Regiment, serving with his brother Edward in Company B. However, he was mustered out due to disability after two months, on the same day that his brother was promoted to Corporal.

After serving in the war, Charles, his brother Edward, and Edward L. Day formed the Day & Williams Glass Company (a.k.a. Day, Williams & Co. and Kent Rock Glass Company). The company was successful from 1865 to 1887, when competitors with access to newly available natural gas were able to underbid companies like his that relied specifically on coal. Edward Williams left the company in 1870 to form his famous partnership with Henry Sherwin.

Taking a break from the business world, Charles accepted a Professorship teaching Greek at Cleveland Central High School in 1887. Charles taught until 1892, publishing a study guide book in 1890 that is still in print (reprint) as of 2014.

In 1892, Charles moved to Chicago and engaged in the import of sugar and fruit as the owner of C.T. Williams Co. In 1896, he was recruited to manage and serve as the vice president of the Cleveland Box Company, a position that he held until his death. While under his leadership the Cleveland Box Company engaged in business across the country and patented a line of special boxes.

Mr. Williams served as a member of the boards of directors for the Merchants & Manufacturers Insurance Company, General Package Company of New York City, Lake Superior Construction Company, and National Box Association of the United States, serving as presiding officer of the National Box Association for one year.

An expert linguist, Charles spoke fluent French and German, and readily read Greek and Latin. Also a passionate musician, he composed and performed as an organist under the nom de plume of "Guglielimi", and played the organ and led the choir in the First Congregational Church of Kent, Ohio for 25 years.

Charles married Mary P. Carver in 1866 in Kent, Ohio, and they had two sons; Dr. William Carver Williams and Day Williams. Mary was a descendant of famed explorer Jonathan Carver and Robert Carver, one of the early (1638) Plymouth Colony settlers and brother of the first governor of Plymouth Colony, John Carver. Mary died in 1896, and in 1907, he married Mari Carlson, from Sweden.
