= Landmark Office Towers Complex =

Complex of three historically renovated 1930-completed high-rises located in Cleveland

Landmark Office Towers
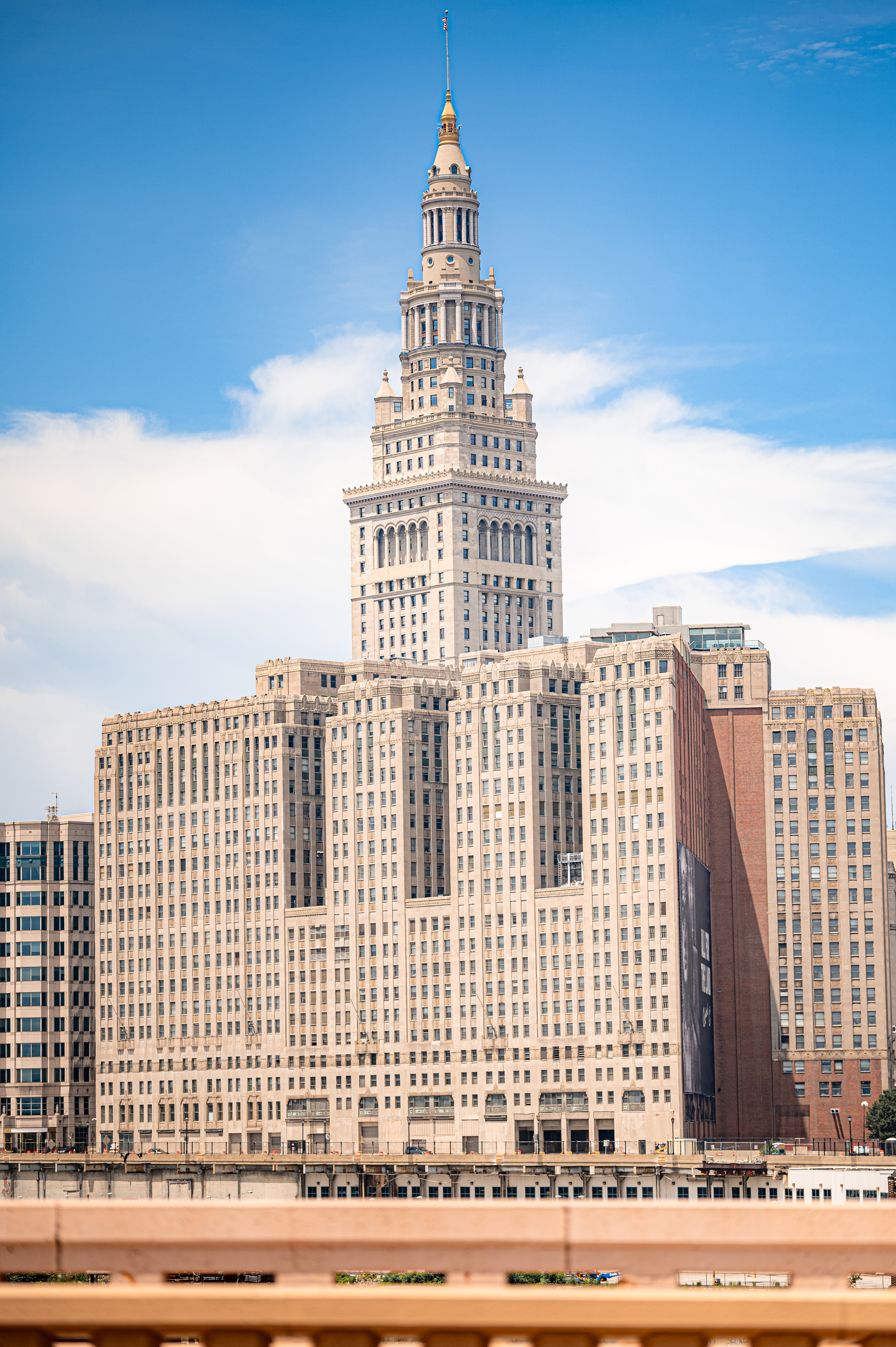
- Photograph of Terminal Tower and the Landmark Office Towers (in the foreground)
- Interactive map of the Landmark Office Towers area
- Former names: Midland Building, Republic Building, Guildhall Building, Medical Arts Building

General information
- Type: Office
- Location: 101 Prospect Avenue Cleveland, Ohio 44114 United States
- Coordinates: 41°29′50″N 81°41′33″W
- Construction started: 1928
- Completed: 1930

Height
- Roof: 78.94 m (259 ft)

Technical details
- Floor count: 22

Design and construction
- Architect: Graham, Anderson, Probst & White

The Landmark Office Towers is a complex of three historically renovated 1930-completed 259 foot 22 story high-rises that are located on the property of Tower City Center in Downtown Cleveland's Public Square district. The building features very deep recesses on its south side. Actually, the building is three towers in one. These are the Midland Bank Building, the Medical Arts Building, and the Builders Exchange Building. The complex was to include a fourth tower that was never completed and so there is still an empty space where that tower was to go to the present day.

== Construction ==
The towers are the 1920s example of what architects thought future buildings would look like as defined by the art deco movement. They were built at a time when Cleveland's population had reach nearly a million and so there was a demand for more and more office space in the city's central business district. It was hoped by the developers, the railroad and real estate magnates Van Sweringen Brothers, that the buildings would serve this need therefore they invested some $20 million in the project. The towers still sit on some of the most expensive and prized land in the city, making them a vital magnet for Cleveland big business. This can be exemplified by the fact the Fortune 500 Sherwin-Williams calls the complex home, having purchased the three buildings in 1985. The 1.2 million sq ft complex was purchased by Billionaire Dan Gilbert's Bedrock group in 2023, prior to Sherwin-Williams's planned move to a new building on Public Square in late 2024.

== See also ==
- List of tallest buildings in Cleveland
- Downtown Cleveland
