= NLI Holdings =

American lead smelting company

NL Industries
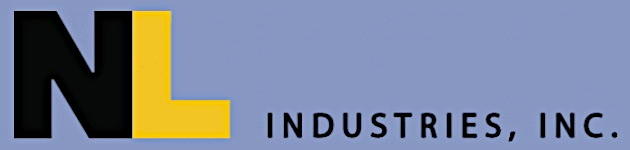
- Type: Public
- Traded as: NYSE: NL; Russell 2000 Index component
- Headquarters: Dallas, Texas, US
- Website: nl-ind.com

NL Industries (NYSE: NL), formerly known as the National Lead Company, is a lead smelting company currently based in Dallas, Texas. National Lead was one of the 12 original stocks included in the Dow Jones Industrial Average at the time of its creation on May 26, 1896.

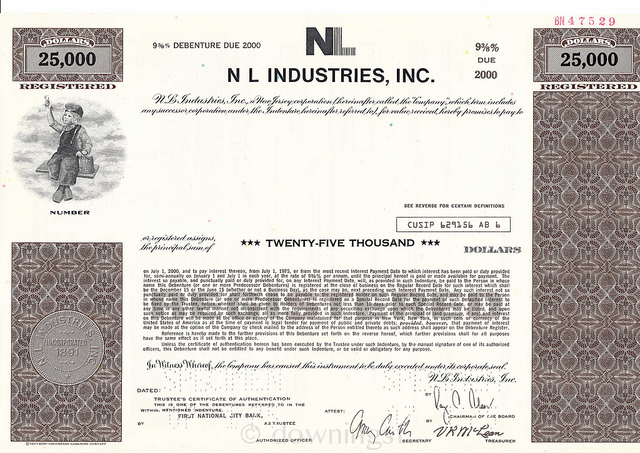
NL Industries (Dutch Boy Paint) Specimen Stock Certificate, c. 1975

== History ==
It began business in Philadelphia in 1772. The name "National Lead Company" was used since 1891 after a series of mergers. National Lead changed its name to NL Industries in 1971.

=== California lead paint liability case ===
NL Industries has encountered legal problems based on their long history of selling lead paint. Exposure to lead paint can cause numerous health and developmental problems in children and adults, and its use has been banned or restricted in many countries.

In January 2014, the Santa Clara County Superior Court ruled that NL Industries, along with Sherwin-Williams and ConAgra, were jointly and severally liable for $1.15 billion, to be paid into a lead paint abatement fund to be used to remove lead paint from older housing. The judge ruled that the paint companies manufactured, marketed, and sold lead paint without disclosing the health risks to the consumers in spite of "actual and constructive knowledge that it was harmful".

The disposition of The People v. ConAgra Grocery Products Company et al. in the California 6th Appellate District Court on November 14, 2017, is that:

... the judgment is reversed, and the matter is remanded to the trial court with directions to (1) recalculate the amount of the abatement fund to limit it to the amount necessary to cover the cost of remediating pre-1951 homes, and (2) hold an evidentiary hearing regarding the appointment of a suitable receiver. The Plaintiff shall recover its costs on appeal.

On February 14, 2018, the California Supreme Court denied the defendants' request for review, sending the case back to the trial court as ordered by the Appellate Court.

NL Industries settled its part of the suit in May, 2018 with a payment of $60 million and a pledge to stop supporting the ConAgra and Sherwin-Williams backed ballot measure proposed for the November, 2018 ballot

=== National Lead and Dutch Boy Paints ===
In 1907, National Lead entered the consumer market for titanium paints, creating a product line under the name "Dutch Boy". Dutch Boy paints competed with other brands that contained mineral products supplied by National Lead. The "Dutch Boy Painter", which was created by Lawrence Carmichael Earle, became National Lead's symbol for many years.

NL Industries sold off the Dutch Boy brand in 1980 to Sherwin-Williams, two years after the CPSC's directive banning the manufacturing of lead housepaint went into effect.

== CompX International ==
CompX International Inc.
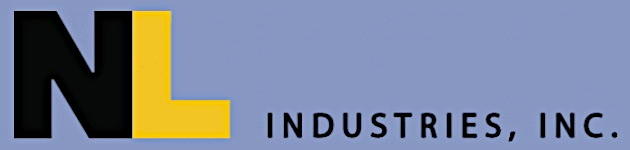
- Type: Public limited company
- Traded as: AMEX: CIX; Russell 2000 Index component
- Industry: Security & Protection Services
- Founded: August 4, 1993
- Headquarters: Dallas, Texas
- Area served: the United States
- Key people: David Bowers (CEO)
- Services: Security Products, Furniture Components and Marine Components
- Operating income: ▲US$ 83.2 million (2012)
- Net income: ▲US$ 35.0 million (2012)
- Total assets: ▲US$ 150.2 million (2012)
- Total equity: ▲US$ 102.1 million (2012)
- Number of employees: 466 (2013)
- Website: www.compx.com

CompX International Inc. is one of the largest manufacturers of security products and recreational marine components in the world. Located in Dallas, Texas, CompX International Inc. is also a subsidiary of NL Industries, Inc. The business of the company is divided into three segments: Security Products, Furniture Components and Marine Components. Their products are designed to meet the high-end applications. CompX International Inc. offers its products through original equipment manufacturers and distributors.

=== History ===
Based in Dallas, Texas, CompX was founded to open business on August 4, 1993. In March 1998, CompX International Inc. completed its initial public offering, making it a public company with stocks traded on the New York Stock Exchange under the symbol of CIX.

In 1999, CompX International moved the corporate headquarters from Mauldin, South Carolina, to Houston.

On Jan 11, 2000, CompX International Inc. acquired Chicago Lock Co. successfully for about $9.2 million in cash, which was borrowed under its existing credit facility. In May 2002, CompX International achieved an agreement to close its Dallas corporate office.

In September 2004, NL Industries completed the acquisition of 68% of CompX International for $168.6 million.

In December 2012, CompX International Inc. sold its Furniture Components operations to Knape & Vogt Manufacturing Company for approximately $59 million in cash.

=== Leadership ===
The main officers of the company are listed as follows:

- David Bowers - President, chief executive officer
- Jim Brown - Chief Financial Officer
