= Sherwin-Williams Headquarters =

Skyscraper in Cleveland, Ohio

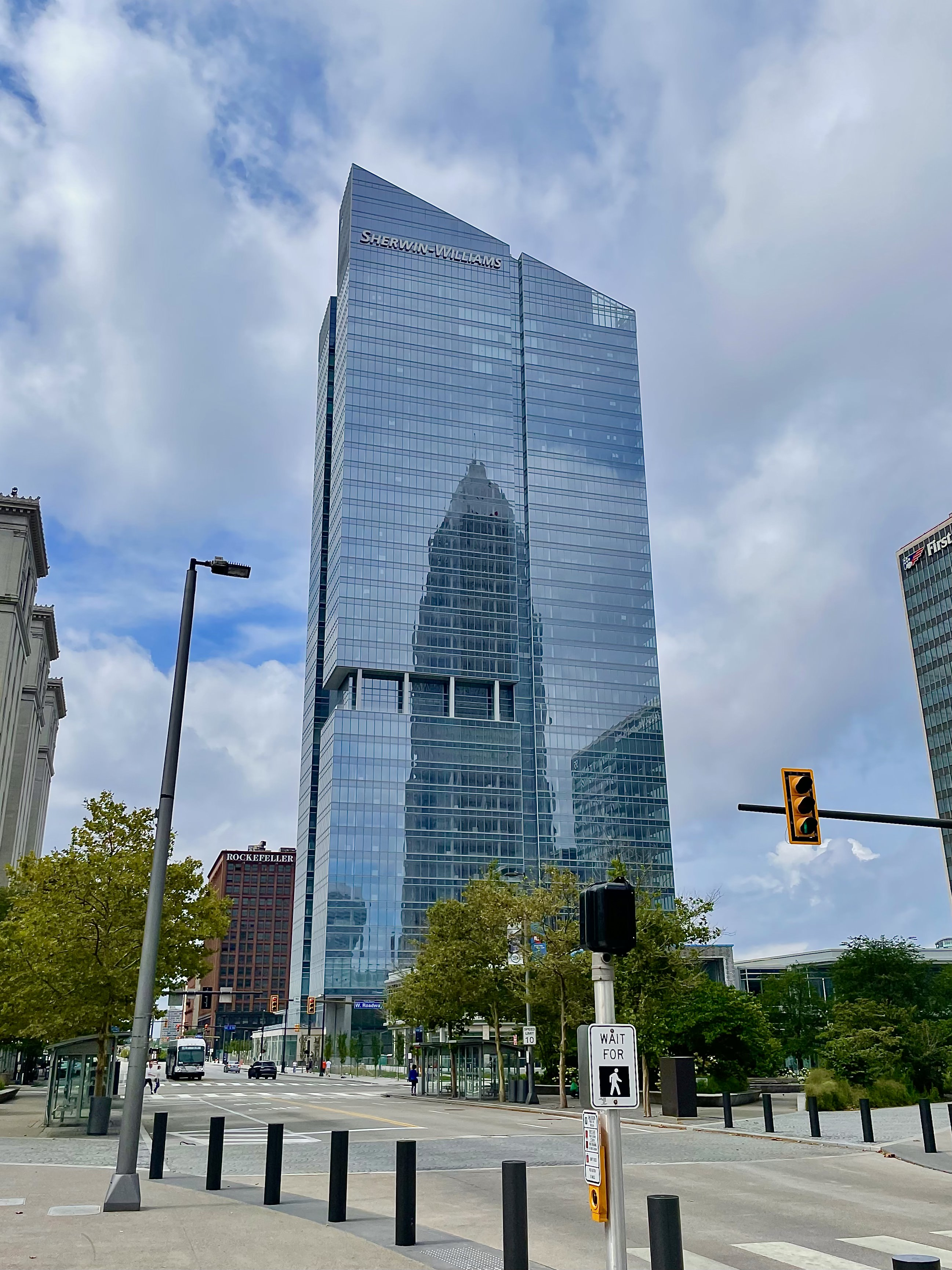
- Sherwin-Williams Headquarters in 2025
- Interactive map of the Sherwin-Williams Headquarters area

General information
- Status: Topped-out
- Type: Office
- Location: 1426 West 3rd Street
- Coordinates: 41°29′57″N 81°41′46″W
- Current tenants: Sherwin-Williams
- Construction started: 2022
- Completed: 2024

Height
- Height: 616 ft (188 m)

Technical details
- Floor count: 36

Design and construction
- Architect: Pickard Chilton
- Civil engineer: Osborn Engineering

The Sherwin-Williams Headquarters is a 36-story office tower in downtown Cleveland, Ohio, United States. At 616 ft (188 m), it is the fourth-tallest building in Cleveland and the sixth-tallest building in Ohio. It is the global headquarters of Sherwin-Williams, the largest paint and coating company in the world. The headquarters complex faces Public Square and covers portions of three city blocks. The complex includes the primary tower, a parking garage, and a pavilion, with hints of possible future expansion within the remainder of the lots.

== History ==
Sherwin-Williams was founded in Cleveland, Ohio in 1866. Since 1930, the company has been headquartered in the Midland Building, which is part of the larger Landmark Office Towers Complex. In 2019, the company announced that it was seeking to move into a larger office building, potentially leaving Cleveland altogether, although they confirmed they would be staying in Cleveland in February 2020. In March 2020, the company paid $49.4 million for the 7 acre plot of land for the building, which was previously a 1,100 space parking lot.

In late 2022, the final design of the building was submitted to the city. Construction of the building began in 2022, with site preparation and foundation construction, both of which were completed in 2023. In 2023, the structural steel construction began and finished, as well as the building enclosure and interior finishes, with the enclosure having finished in 2024. Interior finishing and landscaping continued into 2025. The ribbon cutting occurred on May 11, 2026.

The possibility of an HQ2 has been mentioned since the design phase of the building in 2021, which would be a building adjacent to the current tower within the same lot, as job growth within the company will put the new headquarters at full capacity as soon as it is completed, at the intended 3,500 employees. Surface parking lots were intentionally left in the plans of the headquarters for future development of a Phase Two.

== Design ==
The headquarters contains about 1 million square footage, and contains three buildings, including the primary 36-story tower, a two-story pavilion, and a 5-story parking garage. The main tower is facing W 3rd Street, while the parking garage is located on the other side of Frankfort Avenue connected via a skybridge, while there is a skybridge connecting the tower to the pavilion on the other side of the W 3rd Street. The two empty surface parking lots that remained in the plans for a potential Phase Two are within the same lots as the tower and the parking garage.

The design of the tower is largely glass, with the Sherwin-Williams name being located near the top of the building on both the east and west sides. There is a large vertical LED light running down the center of the building that shines white typically, as well as various thin vertical stripes along the top the part of the building, although in the designs they have shown special event lighting concepts such as red and blue for the Sherwin-Williams logo, pink for Breast Cancer Awareness, red, white, and blue for Veteran's Day, or a rainbow for Pride. The first three floors of the building consists of the lobby and other non-office amenities. Floors 5-13 are to contain office space, and floor 14 is to contain conference rooms and terraces. The parking garage of the building contains space for a retailer, and the wall facing Frankfort Avenue is to contain anthology wall, as well as public art facing other streets. Frankfort Avenue, the street between the tower and the garage, is to be repaved with a herringbone pattern consisting of three colors, with the addition of a bike lane and bike racks.

The pavilion of the tower, located across the street, takes up an entire city block, although the two story pavilion building only takes up part of the lot, with the rest of the lot acting as a public plaza with lots of green landscaping. The pavilion building is to contain large glass windows visible from every side, and contains a lobby. The plaza of the pavilion contains a purple-pink color garden, a rainbow walkway alongside the pavilion building and main tower, and various trees, with dozens of species of flowers and trees within the plaza and around the headquarters complex as a whole. The lawn in the plaza is to contain a large sign saying Sherwin-Williams Global Headquarters. Additionally, various colorful directional signs for both pedestrians and vehicles will be placed around the campus.

== See also ==
- List of tallest buildings in Cleveland
- List of tallest buildings in Ohio
- List of largest office buildings
