= Howard M. Metzenbaum United States Courthouse =

- Old Federal Building and Post Office
- U.S. National Register of Historic Places
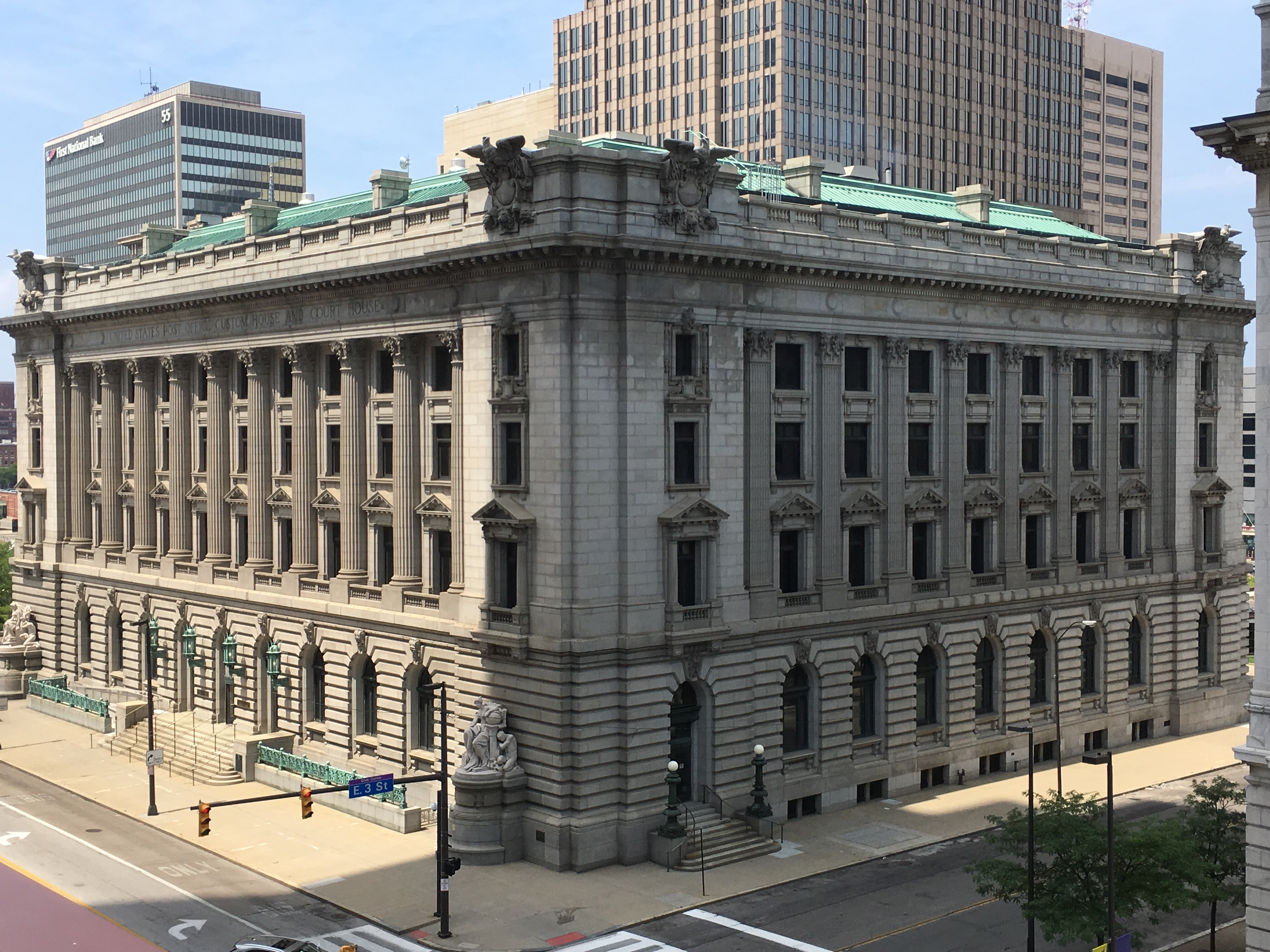
- Seen in 2018

- Location within Cleveland Location within Ohio Location within the United States
- Location: 201 Superior Ave., NE, Cleveland, Ohio
- Coordinates: 41°30′2″N 81°41′33.5″W
- Area: 1 acre (0.40 ha)
- Architect: Arnold W. Brunner; Daniel Chester French
- Architectural style: Beaux Arts Classicism
- NRHP reference No.: 74001448
- Added to NRHP: May 3, 1974

The Howard M. Metzenbaum U.S. Courthouse is a historic courthouse and post office building located on Superior Avenue in Downtown Cleveland, Ohio, U.S. Its west side faces Public Square and its north side faces The Mall. Named for U.S. Senator Howard Metzenbaum, it was formerly the Federal Building and U.S. Courthouse and also known as Old Federal Building and Post Office.

== History ==
The Howard M. Metzenbaum U.S. Courthouse, also known as the Federal Building and U.S. Courthouse, is a monumental anchor to Cleveland's Civic Mall. Fronting the Mall and Public Square, it was the first building erected under Cleveland's 1903 Group Plan, which illustrates the urban planning ideals of the City Beautiful movement.

New York architect Arnold W. Brunner (1857–1925) designed the building under the direction of Supervising Architect of the Treasury James Knox Taylor (1857–1929). It is one of 35 buildings constructed during Taylor's tenure (1883–1912) that were designed by independent architects commissioned by the U.S. Treasury Department under the Tarsney Act. The 1893 Act authorized the Secretary of the Treasury to use private architects, selected through competitions, to design Federal buildings. As a process, it manifested the growing demand for greater architectural standards for public buildings and opened the way for additional appropriations to maintain those standards.

As the first building erected under the Group Plan, the federal building was the model for later structures. The Group Plan proposed that local and federal government buildings be placed around a grand Mall. Embraced from the late 19th century into the first decades of the 20th century, the City Beautiful movement had its beginnings with the monumental planning and predominately classical architectural style of the 1893 World's Columbian Exposition in Chicago. Celebrated architect Daniel Burnham, who was instrumental in promoting the nationwide adoption of City Beautiful Movement principles, served as a member of the design team that produced the Group Plan. Arnold W. Brunner, working as an independent architect, and John Merven Carrère, of the prominent New York firm of Carrère and Hastings, also served on the team. The Federal Building formed one half of the Mall's termination at Superior Avenue. Cleveland's Public Library (1925), forming the other half of this terminus, emulates the Federal Building in scale, mass, and general overall appearance.

The building was listed in the National Register of Historic Places in 1974. On May 27, 1998, the building was officially renamed in honor of U.S. Senator Howard Metzenbaum of Ohio.

== Architecture ==
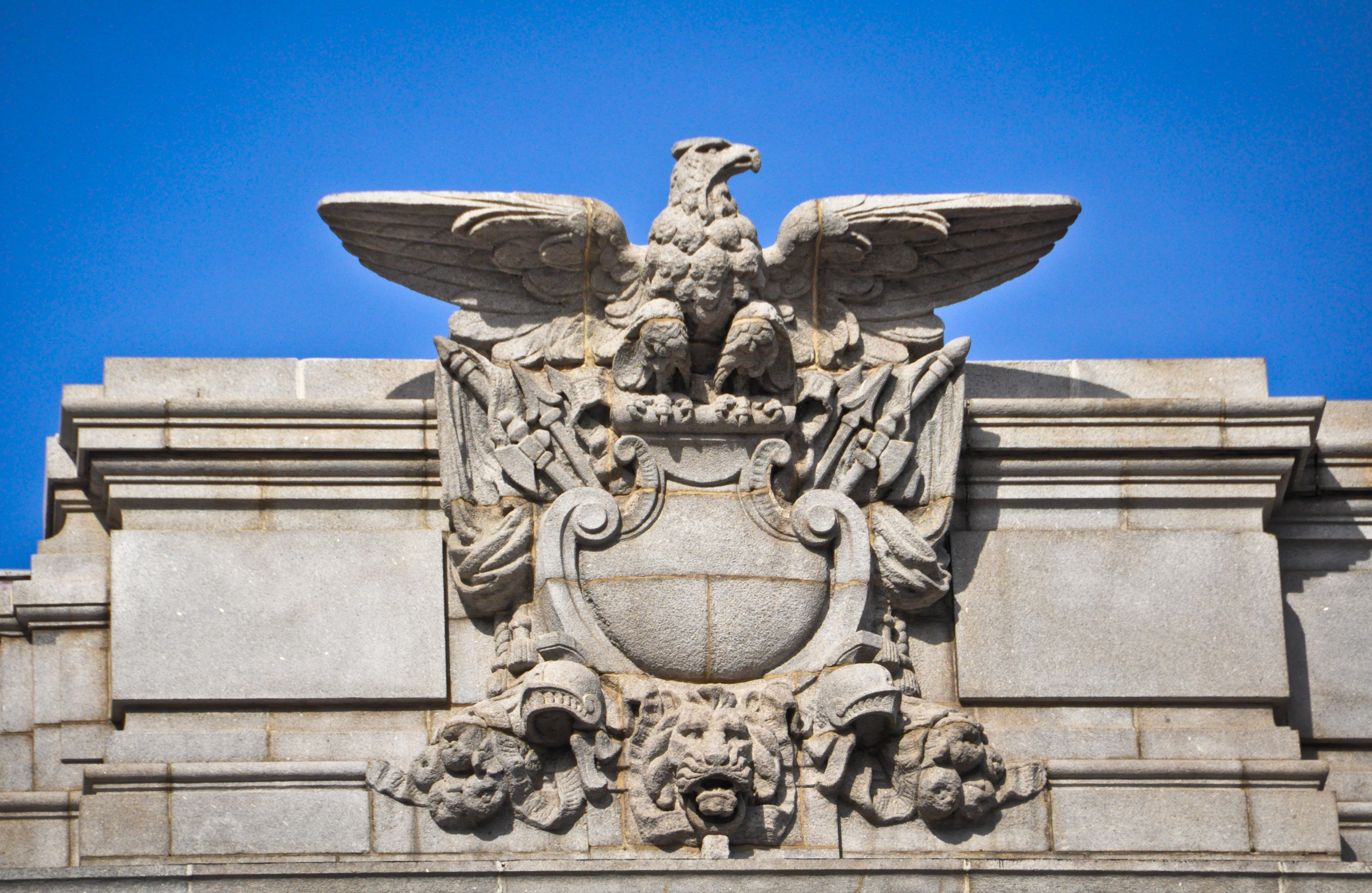
One of the decorative stone eagles at the building's roofline

The Howard M. Metzenbaum U.S. Courthouse is one of Cleveland's great monumental public buildings, skillfully illustrating the strong, classical characteristics of Beaux-Arts architecture. The five-story, granite-faced building was constructed between 1903 and 1910. The building covers the entire city block bounded by Rockwell Avenue on the north, Superior Avenue on the south, East Third Street on the east, and Public Square on the west.

Inspiration for the design of this Beaux Arts building came from the Place de la Concorde in Paris as well as the work of French architect and theorist Francois Blondel. The resulting design presents a rusticated first floor and 42-foot-high (13 m) Corinthian order columns and pilasters on each elevation. These massive columns and pilasters define the sequence of window bays on the second, third, and fourth stories. Rusticated stone-arched windows with carved keystones adorn the first story. The more ornate second-story windows are capped with classically inspired pediments and balustraded sills. The third- and fourth-story window openings have molded surrounds and bracketed sills. Screening the fifth floor is an expansive entablature capped by a balustraded parapet that rises nine feet. A low-hipped, standing-seam copper roof crowns the building with attic dormer windows facing the interior light court. The parapets are adorned with shields and carved stone eagles at the building's corners.

External videos
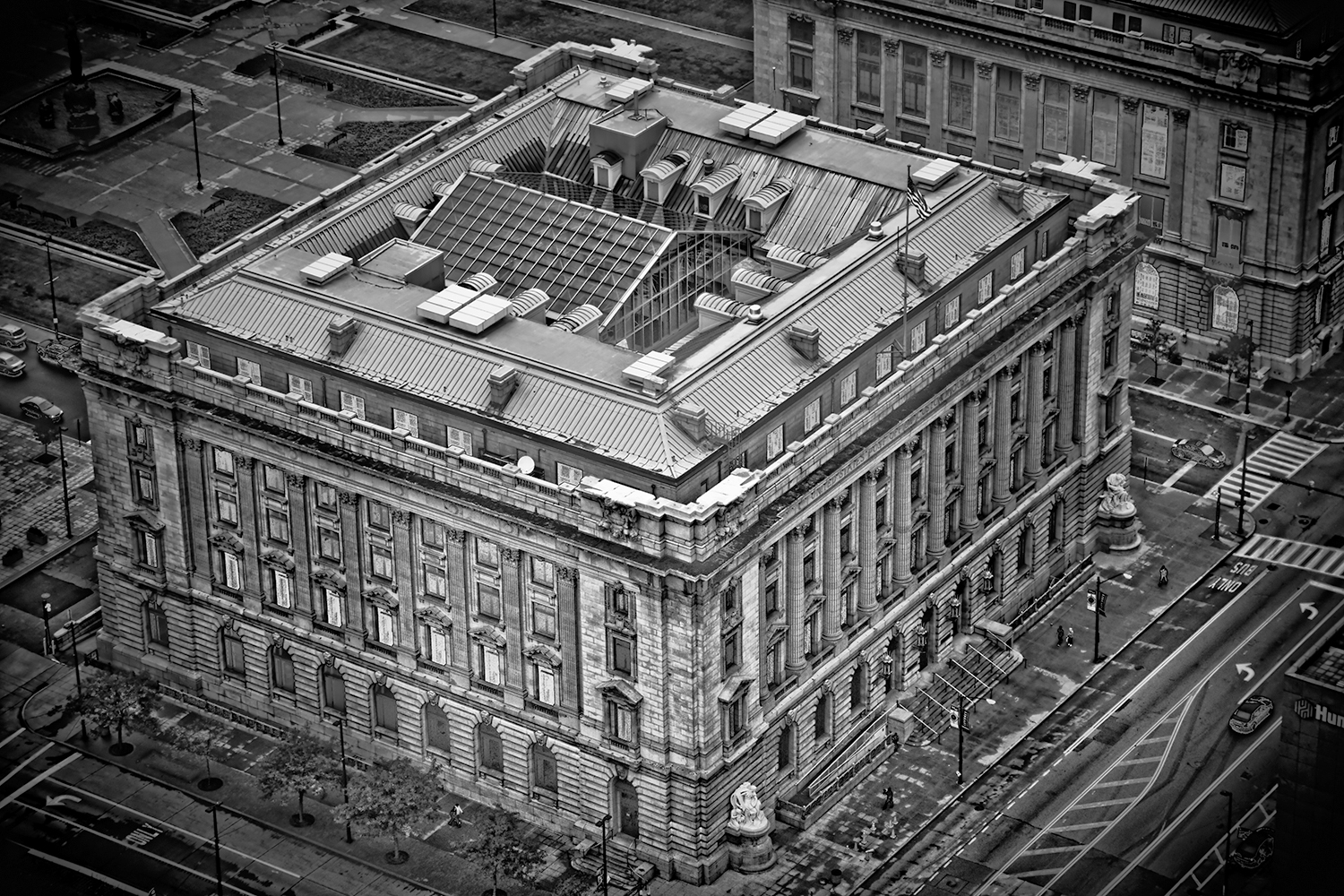
- Power and Poetry: Howard M. Metzenbaum U.S. Courthouse, Cleveland, Ohio, U.S. General Services Administration

The main entrance to the building is centered on the Superior Avenue facade. Granite steps lead to three rusticated stone arches once fitted with cast bronze doors and ornate bronze lanterns hang from cast bronze brackets. The original doors have been replaced.

Flanking the primary entrance are two important sculptures executed by the famed sculptor Daniel Chester French (1850–1931). Jurisprudence is located on the Public Square corner, while Commerce sits at the corner of East Third Street and Superior Avenue. Jurisprudence is personified by a mother figure clasping her baby while a criminal crouches in chains. Commerce is depicted as a female figure holding a model ship in one hand while her other arm rests on a globe representing the opportunity for world trade. At her right is Electricity, symbolized by a female figure holding a magnet catching electrical sparks. Steam, located to her left, is represented by a male figure grasping a wheel.

On the interior, the grand main lobby dominates the first floor as it runs east to west across the entire length of the building. The floors, walls, and vaulted ceiling of the lobby are surfaced with marble. Original chandeliers illuminate the space. The postal service windows are located along the lobby's north wall. Marble stairs wrap around three sides of the elevator shafts, located at the east and west ends of the public lobby. Cast-bronze, spread-wing eagles standing on globes appear over each pair of elevator doors. Corner offices in the upper floors are adorned with murals depicting significant events in the history of Cleveland. Among the artworks are City of Cleveland Welcomes the Arts by Will Hicok Low (1853–1932), and the Battle of Lake Erie by Rufus Fairchild Zogbaum (1849–1925). Murals in the ceremonial courtrooms on the third floor are The Common Law by Henry Siddons Mowbray (1858–1928), and The Law by Edwin Howland Blashfield (1848–1936).

A major renovation project to restore public spaces and modernize the mechanical systems was initiated in 2002. Although the primary activities of the U.S. District Court system have moved to the new Carl B. Stokes Federal Court House Building a few blocks west, the ceremonial courtrooms in the Metzenbaum Courthouse will continue to be used for public hearings and proceedings. New client agencies moving into the renovated building will include the U.S. Bankruptcy Court, the Office of the U.S. Trustee, and the U.S. Marshals Service.

== Significant events ==
- 1893: Passage of the Tarsney Act permits the Federal Government to hire private architects through competitions.
- 1902: The 1858 federal building is demolished to allow for the construction of a new U.S. Post Office, Custom House, and Courthouse building.
- 1903: The Cleveland Group Plan is presented; construction of the new federal building begins under direction of New York architect Arnold W. Brunner.
- 1905: May 20, 1905 - cornerstone is laid
- 1910: Construction is completed.
- 1911: Building is dedicated
- 1934: The main U.S. Post Office moves out of the building.
- 1939: Building is cleaned
- 1950: The U.S. General Services Administration initiates alterations and construction of additional courtrooms.
- 1966: Air conditioning is installed, building is cleaned
- 1974: The building is listed in the National Register of Historic Places.
- 1998: The building is renamed in honor of U.S. Senator Howard M. Metzenbaum of Ohio.
- 2002: Extensive rehabilitation and modernization of the building to better serve new client agencies.

== Building facts ==
- Architect: Arnold W. Brunner
- Construction dates: 1903-1910
- Landmark status: Listed in the National Register of Historic Places
- Location: 201 Superior Avenue, NE
- Architectural style: Beaux-Arts
- Primary materials: Gray granite
- Prominent features: Exterior sculptures "Jurisprudence" and "Commerce" by Daniel Chester French; ceremonial courtrooms

== See also ==
- List of United States federal courthouses
- Public sculptures by Daniel Chester French
