= Pratt & Lambert =

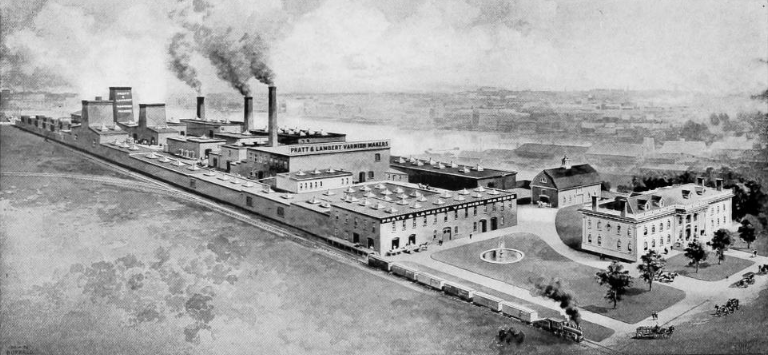
The Pratt & Lambert plant in Buffalo, c. 1908

Pratt & Lambert is a brand of architectural and industrial paint founded in 1849. It has been owned by Sherwin-Williams since 1995.

The Pratt & Lambert company started in Buffalo, New York in 1849 as a maker of a drying agent for linseed oil paint. It was listed on the American Stock Exchange in 1905. In 1920, it started manufacturing exterior and interior house paints and varnishes. In 1950, the company began production of latex paints. It merged with United Coatings in August 1994.

The company was purchased by Sherwin-Williams in 1995.
