= Lawrence Carmichael Earle =

American painter

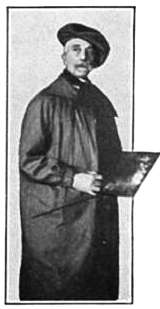
- Born: November 11, 1845; New York City, New York
- Died: 1921 (aged 75–76); Grand Rapids, Michigan
- Occupation: Painter
- Notable work: Dutch Boy Painter
- Parent(s): John Earle and Mary Dorset

Lawrence Carmichael Earle (November 11, 1845 – 1921) was an American painter. Born in New York City, Lawrence lived in Grand Rapids, Michigan as a child for 11 or 12 years (from 1856 until about 1868), when he left for formal art instruction. In 1897, he was elected into the National Academy of Design as an Associate Academician. He returned to Grand Rapids in 1909, living there until his death in 1921.

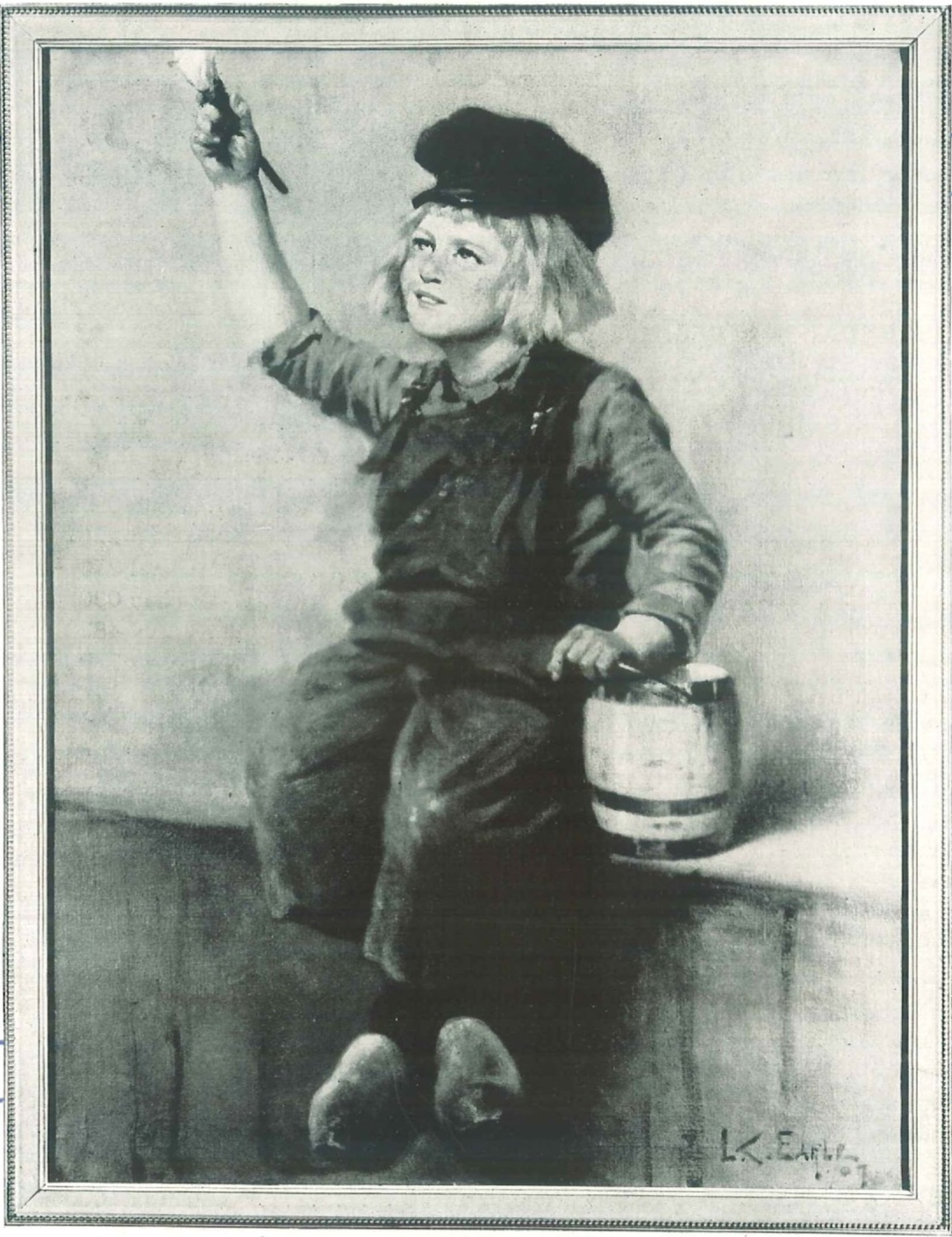
Dutch Boy Painter

He painted the Dutch Boy Painter in 1907, currently used as the logo for Dutch Boy Paints, which itself is currently owned by Sherwin-Williams.
