= Rufus Fairchild Zogbaum =

American painter

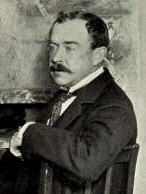
- Zogbaum in 1894
- Born: Rufus Fairchild Zogbaum; August 28, 1849; Brooklyn, New York (state), U.S.
- Died: October 22, 1925 (aged 76); New Rochelle, New York, U.S.
- Known for: Illustration, Painting, Drawing, Journalism

Rufus Fairchild Zogbaum (August 28, 1849 — October 22, 1925) was an American illustrator, journalist, and writer. He is primarily known as an illustrator for late 19th century news magazines. His works were regularly featured in Harper's Weekly magazine.

== Early life and education ==
Zogbaum was born in Charleston, South Carolina. He was educated at the Art Students League in New York City from 1878 to 1879, and during 1880–1882 studied under Léon Bonnat in Paris.

== Career ==
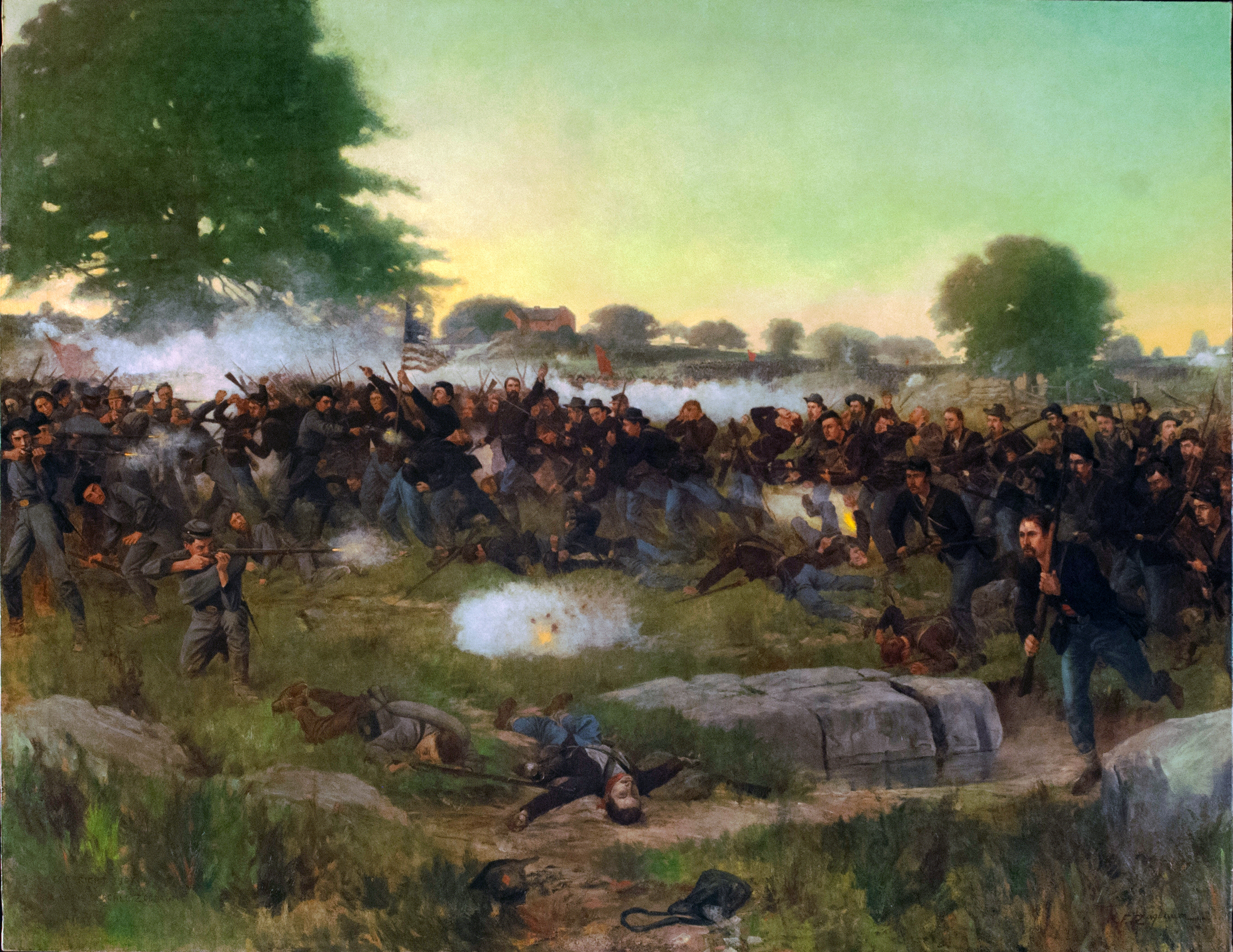
The Battle of Gettysburg, c. 1906, now on display at the Governor’s Reception Room at the Minnesota State Capitol

Harper's Weekly normally hired freelance illustrators; nevertheless, for a time Zogbaum was on the magazine's art staff and was sometimes given the assignment to redraw submissions by freelance illustrators. In the 19th-century news magazine world, redrawing illustrations was the equivalent of editing writers’ works. Two of the most famous artists who made illustrations for Harper’s were Winslow Homer and Frederic Remington, whose first few illustrations for Harper’s were redrawn by staff artists, including Zogbaum. Zogbaum and Rockwell both lived and worked in New Rochelle, New York, a well-known art colony especially popular among illustrators of the early twentieth century.

Rudyard Kipling referred to Zogbaum in a poem he sent to then-Captain (later Rear Admiral) Robley D. Evans, U.S. Navy, in 1896.

Admiral [Robley D.] Evans

Zogbaum draws with a pencil,
And I do things with a pen.
And you sit up in a conning tower
Bossing eight hundred men.

Zogbaum takes care of his business
And I take care of mine.
And you take care of ten thousand tons,
Sky-shooting through the brine.

Zogbaum can handle his shadows
And I can handle my style.
And you can handle a ten-inch gun
To carry seven mile.

"To him that hath shall be given."
And that's why these books are sent
To the man who had lived more stories
Than Zogbaum or I could invent.

== Specialization and influence ==
"The Battle of Lake Erie, September 10, 1813", a mural in the Howard M. Metzenbaum U.S. Courthouse

Zogbaum specialized in several areas of illustration. During his lifetime, his drawings and paintings of horses and military themes (U.S. Army and Navy) were almost as well known as Remington’s, although he was older than Remington and his works had actually influenced the younger artist. As did Remington, during the Spanish–American War, Zogbaum served as an on-the-scene artist-correspondent. His 1897 book, All Hands: Pictures of Life in the United States Navy, is a collector's item featuring 36 full page illustrations. He painted a mural of the Battle of Lake Erie in 1910 for the Howard M. Metzenbaum U.S. Courthouse in Cleveland, Ohio.

== Descendants ==
His son, Rufus F. Zogbaum, Jr., became an admiral in the U.S. Navy, and his grandson, Wilfrid Zogbaum (1915–1965), was a painter and sculptor who had teaching stints in several universities, including the University of California, Berkeley.
