= Minwax =

American architectural coating manufacturer

Minwax Company
- Company type: Public
- Industry: Coatings
- Founded: New York, New York, United States (1904)
- Founder: Arthur B. Harrison
- Headquarters: Cleveland, Ohio, United States
- Area served: North America
- Products: Wood Stains; Clear Finishes; Industrial coating; Painting equipment
- Brands: Minwax Wood Finish Stain
- Parent: Sherwin-Williams
- Website: minwax.com

Minwax Company is a manufacturer of architectural coatings such as wood putty and Epoxy.

== History ==
Minwax was founded in 1904 by Arthur B Harrison. Harrison persuaded his employer at Clifford I. Miller to manufacture a line of waterproofing materials, and later bought the line in 1910, which he then named Minwax®.
