= Dutch Boy Paint =

American paint manufacturer

Dutch Boy
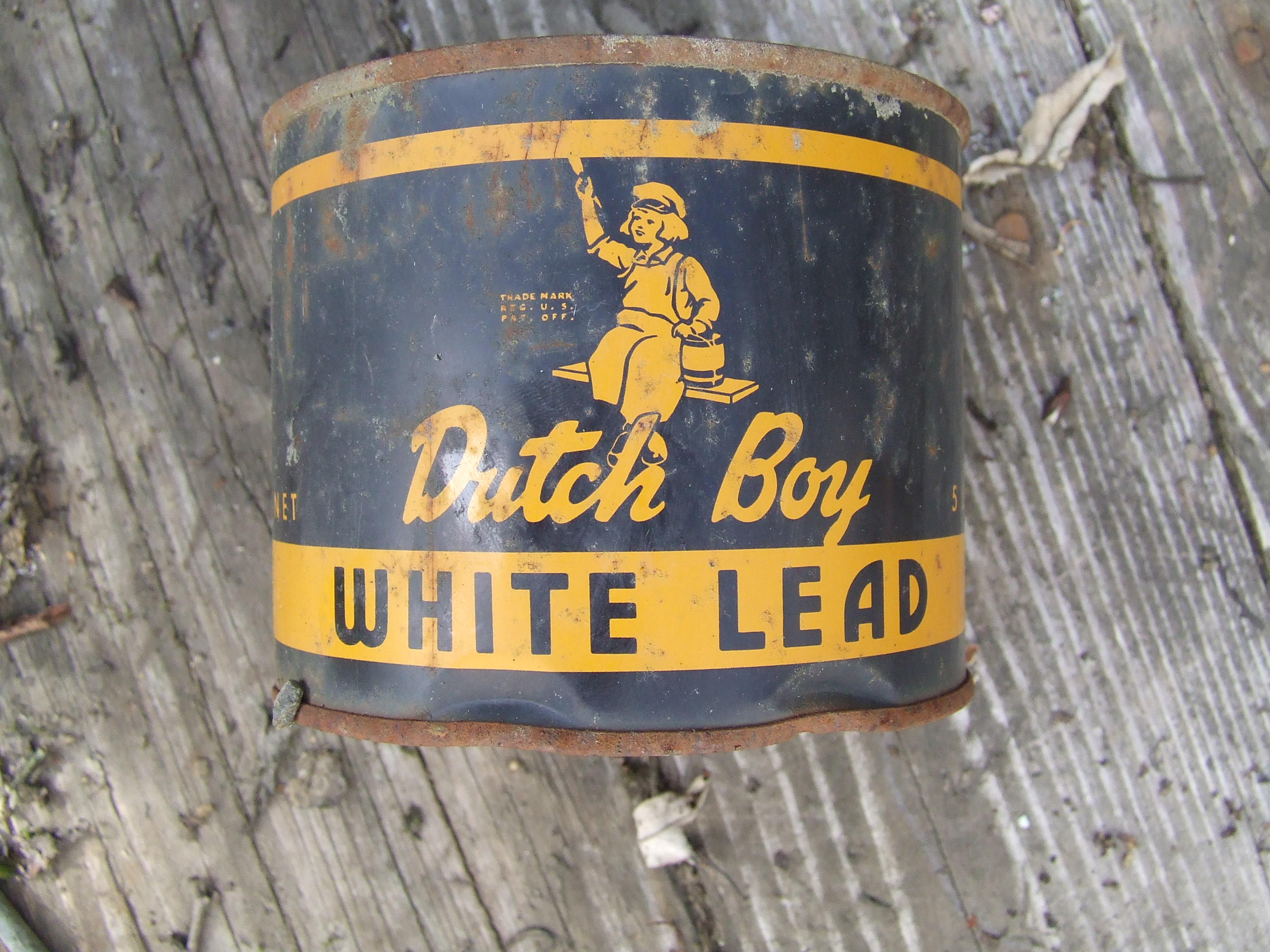
- Product type: Paint
- Current owner: Sherwin-Williams (1980)
- Country: U.S.
- Introduced: 1907
- Markets: U.S.
- Previous owners: National Lead Company (1907–1980)
- Website: dutchboy.com

The Dutch Boy Group is a paint manufacturing company currently headquartered in Cleveland, Ohio. Founded in 1907 by the National Lead Company, the Dutch Boy Paints brand is currently a subsidiary of the Consumer Group division of the Sherwin-Williams Company, which acquired it in 1980, two years after the U.S. Consumer Product Safety Commission's directive banning the manufacturing of lead housepaint went into effect. Modern Dutch Boy paint is a lead-free acrylic paint.

== Trademark ==
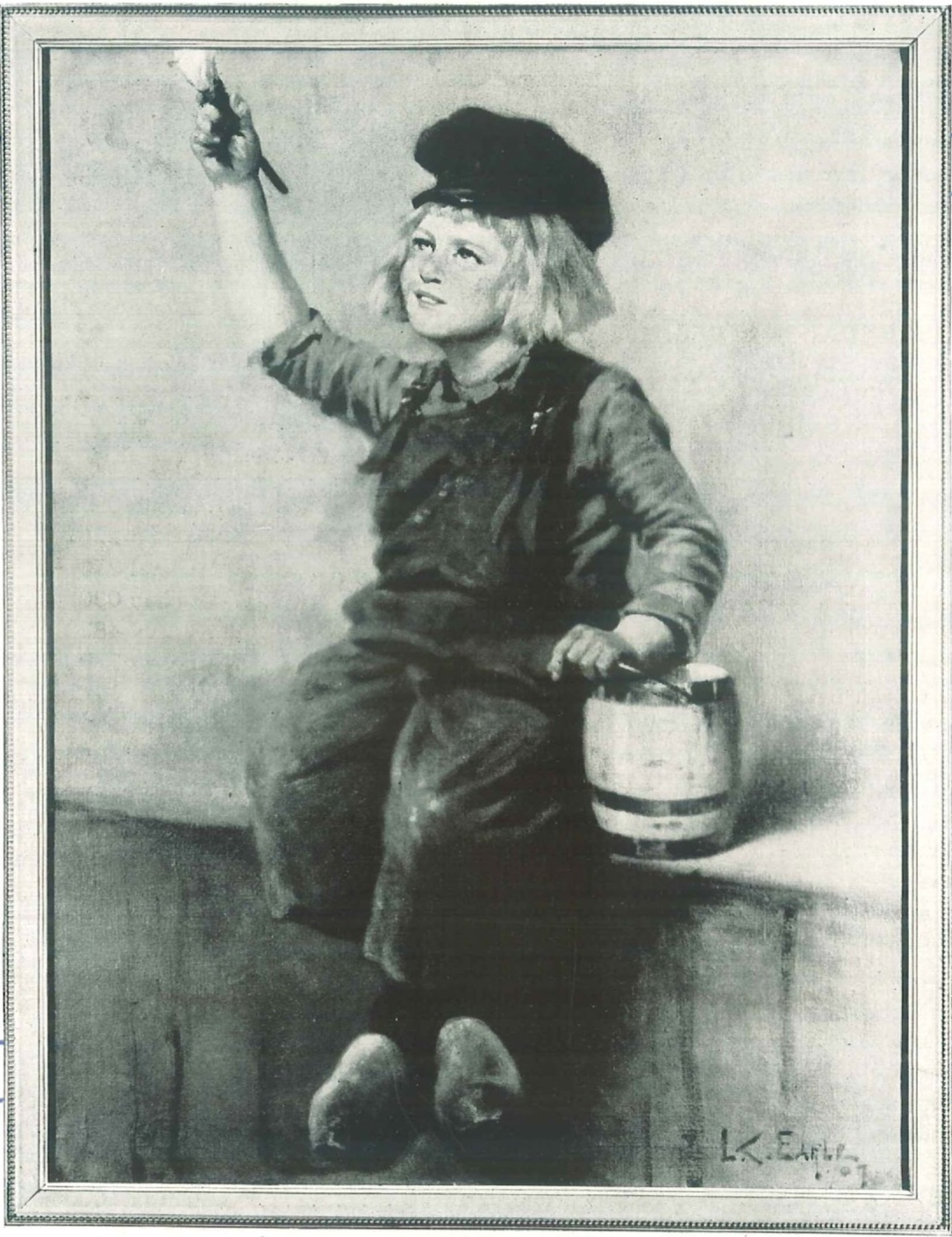
Original painting done for the National Lead Company and used as the logo

Dutch Boy uses a stylized Dutch child as its trademark. He was painted by Lawrence Carmichael Earle and modeled after an Irish-American lad who lived near him named Michael Edward Brady.

== Products ==
- Ceiling paints
- Exterior paints
- Faux finishes
- Interior paints
- Paint samples
- Primers
- Porch and Floor
