= Baltimore, Vermont =

- Town
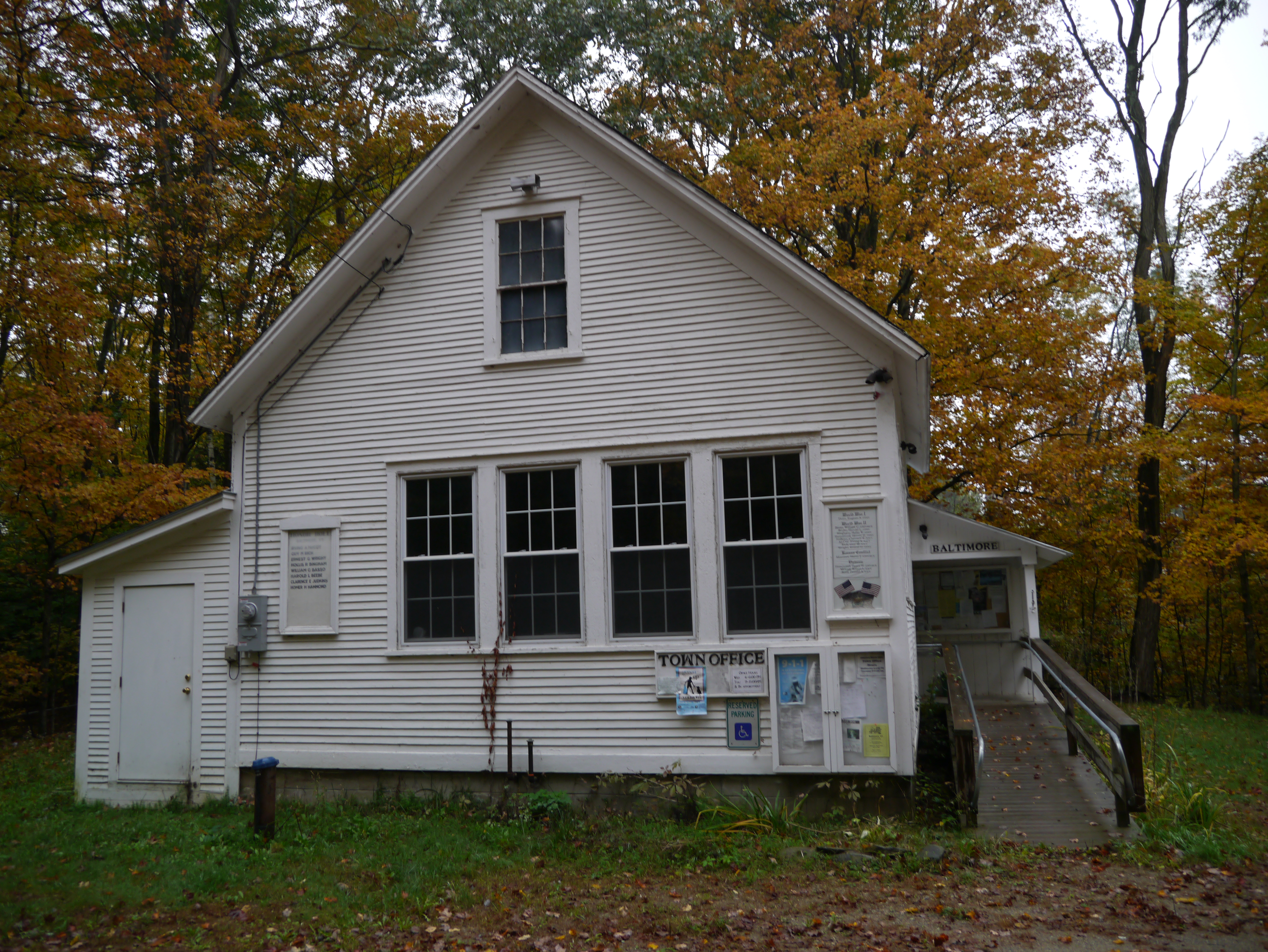
- Baltimore Town Office

- Location in Windsor County and the state of Vermont.
- Coordinates: 43°22′05″N 72°33′31″W
- Country: United States
- State: Vermont
- County: Windsor

Area
  - Total: 4.7 sq mi (12.1 km^{2})
  - Land: 4.7 sq mi (12.1 km^{2})
  - Water: 0 sq mi (0.0 km^{2})
- Elevation: 961 ft (293 m)

Population (2020)
  - Total: 229
  - Density: 49.0/sq mi (18.9/km^{2})
- Time zone: UTC-5 (Eastern (EST))
  - Summer (DST): UTC-4 (EDT)
- ZIP code: 05143
- Area code: 802
- FIPS code: 50-02575
- GNIS feature ID: 1462032
- Website: www.baltimorevt.org

Baltimore is a town located in Windsor County, Vermont, United States. As of the 2020 census, the population of Baltimore was recorded as 229. Baltimore is the only dry town remaining in Vermont, since nearby Athens voted to become wet in 2024.

== Geography ==
According to the United States Census Bureau, the town has a total area of 4.7 square miles (12.1 km^{2}), all land.

== Demographics ==
Historical population
Census	Pop.	Note	%±
1800	174		—
1810	207		19.0%
1820	204		−1.4%
1830	179		−12.3%
1840	155		−13.4%
1850	124		−20.0%
1860	116		−6.5%
1870	83		−28.4%
1880	71		−14.5%
1890	64		−9.9%
1900	55		−14.1%
1910	54		−1.8%
1920	62		14.8%
1930	69		11.3%
1940	85		23.2%
1950	89		4.7%
1960	90		1.1%
1970	170		88.9%
1980	181		6.5%
1990	190		5.0%
2000	250		31.6%
2010	244		−2.4%
2020	229		−6.1%
U.S. Decennial Census

As of the census of 2000, there were 250 people, 92 households, and 74 families residing in the town. The population density was 53.5 people per square mile (20.7/km^{2}). There were 105 housing units at an average density of 22.5 per square mile (8.7/km^{2}). The racial makeup of the town was 98.00% White, 0.40% African American, 0.40% Native American, 0.40% Asian, and 0.80% from two or more races. Hispanic or Latino of any race were 0.40% of the population.

There were 92 households, out of which 34.8% had children under the age of 18 living with them, 68.5% were married couples living together, 7.6% had a female householder with no husband present, and 18.5% were non-families. 7.6% of all households were made up of individuals, and 2.2% had someone living alone who was 65 years of age or older. The average household size was 2.72 and the average family size was 2.88.

In the town, the population was spread out, with 24.8% under the age of 18, 6.4% from 18 to 24, 32.8% from 25 to 44, 25.6% from 45 to 64, and 10.4% who were 65 years of age or older. The median age was 37 years. For every 100 females, there were 125.2 males. For every 100 females age 18 and over, there were 111.2 males.

The median income for a household in the town was $44,375, and the median income for a family was $46,964. Males had a median income of $28,750 versus $21,563 for females. The per capita income for the town was $17,260. About 2.4% of families and 7.0% of the population were below the poverty line, including 2.9% of those under the age of eighteen and none of those 65 or over.
