= Edward Williams (businessman) =

American businessman (1843-1903)

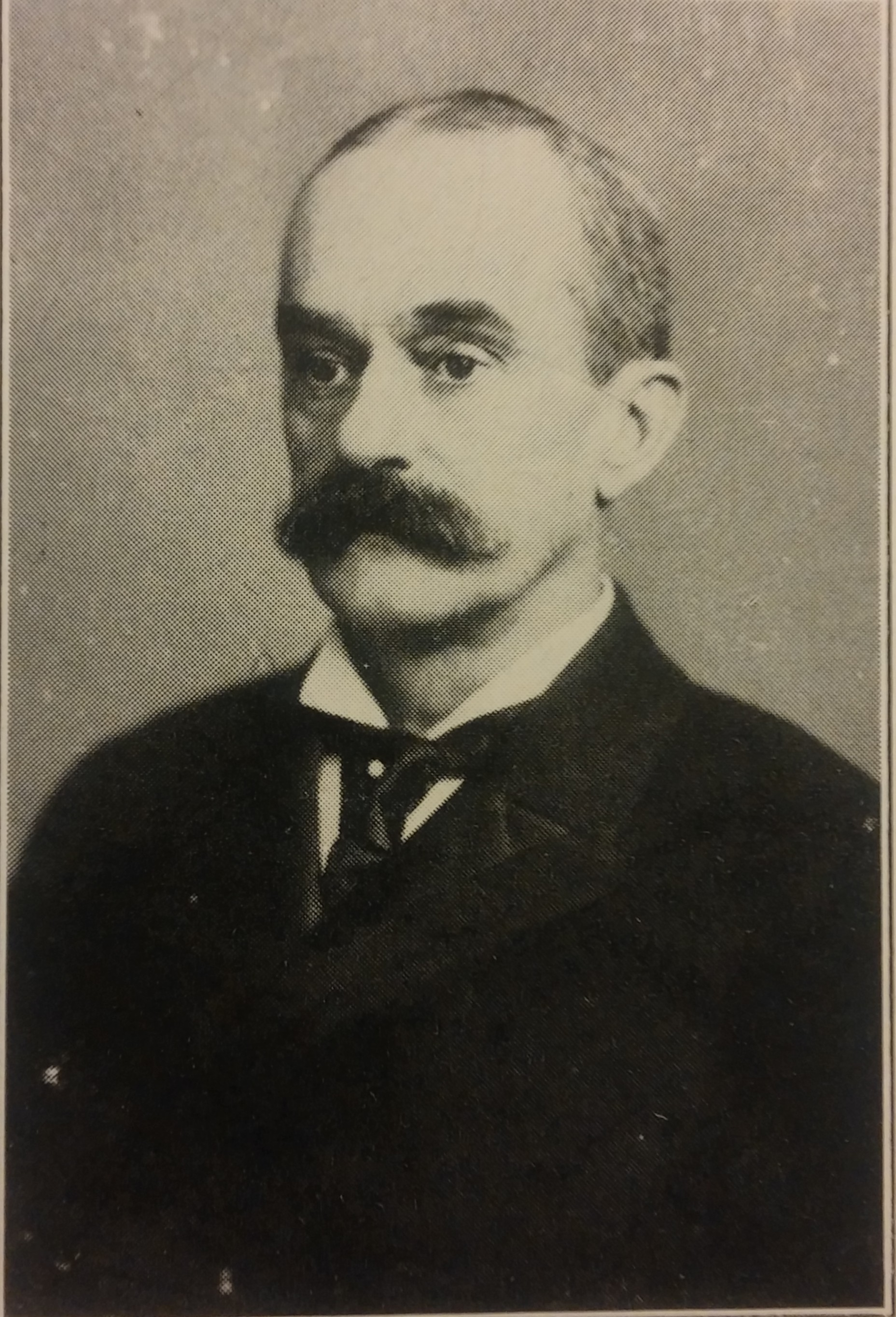
- Edward Porter Williams
- Born: Edward Porter Williams; May 10, 1843; Cleveland, Ohio, US
- Died: May 4, 1903 (aged 59); Cleveland, Ohio, US
- Resting place: Lake View Cemetery, Cleveland, Ohio, U.S.
- Education: Western Reserve College
- Occupation: Businessman
- Known for: Founding partner of Sherwin-Williams Company

Edward Porter Williams (May 10, 1843 – May 4, 1903) was an American businessman who co-founded the Sherwin-Williams Company with Henry Sherwin.

== Early life ==
Born in Cleveland, Ohio, he graduated from Cleveland Central High School in 1859, then earned a bachelor's (1864) and master's (1869) degree from Western Reserve College (now Case Western Reserve University).

== Civil War ==
Edward and his brother Charles joined the Army in 1862, along with the entire Western Reserve College, faculty and student alike. They were assigned to Company B, 85th Ohio and held a short-term assignment at Camp Chase guarding Confederate prisoners. He mustered out at Columbus, Ohio, and had to be carried there on a cot, as he was recovering from typhoid fever.

== Family ==
Edward married Mary Louise Mason. Their children were Edward Mason Williams (married Mary Redmond), Sarah Granger Williams (married Abram Garfield), Lewis Mason Williams (married Lester Coffeen), Reba Louise Williams (married Arthur Douglas Baldwin), and Walter Williams.

== Business ==
In 1865, Edward and his brother Charles, along with Edward L Day entered the glass business in Kent, Ohio as Day & Williams. He left that company in 1870, investing $15,000 to partner with Henry A. Sherwin. Edward P. Williams was executive vice president and a member of the board of directors of the company at the time of his death.

== Burial ==
Edward Porter Williams is buried at Lakeview Cemetery in Cleveland, Ohio.
