= Public Square, Cleveland =

Historic central plaza in Cleveland, Ohio, U.S.

- Cleveland Public Square
- U.S. National Register of Historic Places
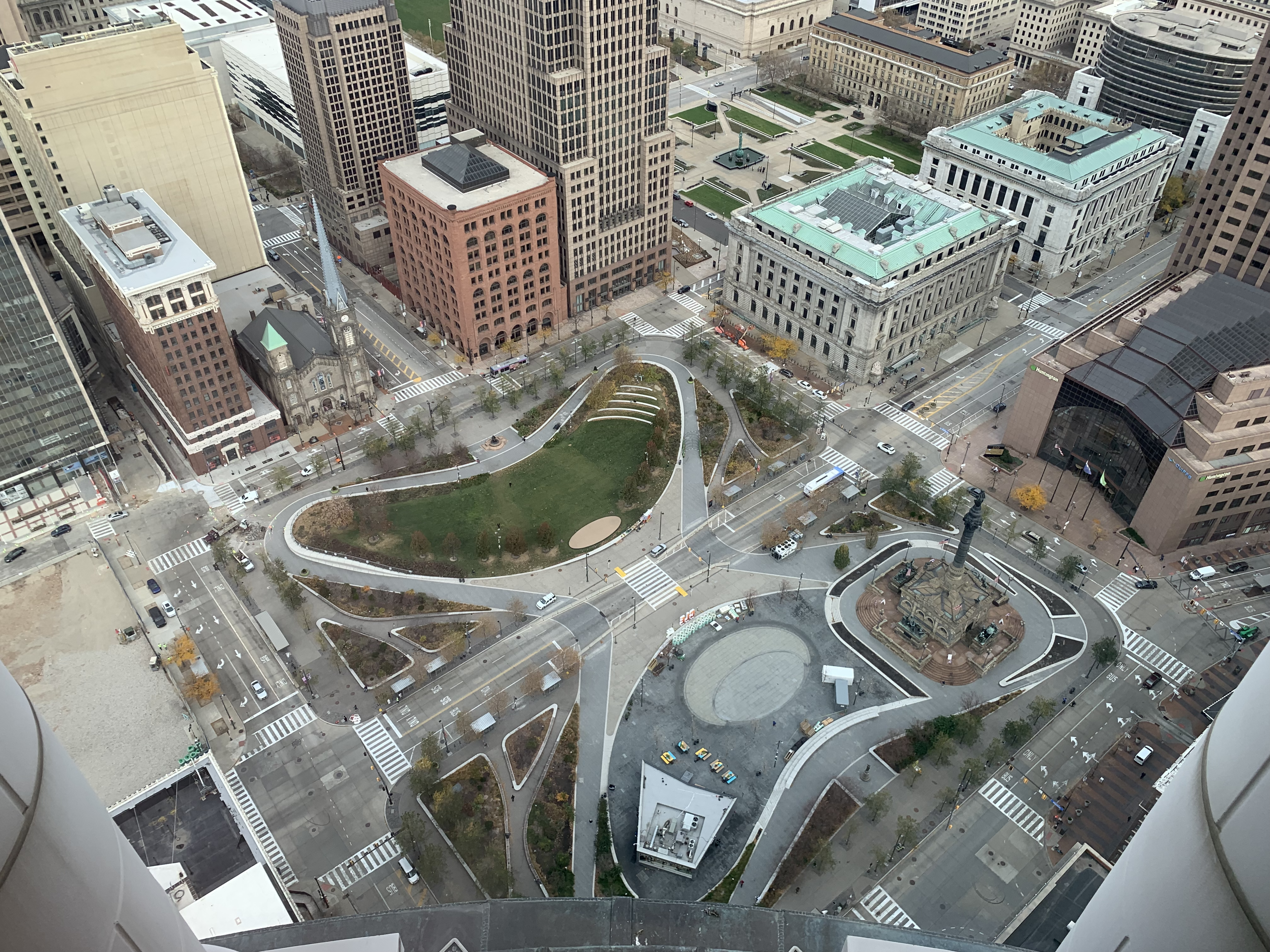

- Location within Cleveland Location within Ohio Location within the United States
- Location: Superior Avenue and Ontario Street; Cleveland, Ohio, U.S.
- Coordinates: 41°29′59″N 81°41′38″W
- Built: 1857-1861
- NRHP reference No.: 75001361
- Added to NRHP: December 18, 1975

Public Square is the central plaza of downtown Cleveland, Ohio. Based on an 18th-century New England model, it was part of the original 1796 town plat overseen by city founder General Moses Cleaveland of the Connecticut Land Company. The historical center of the city's downtown, it was added to the National Register of Historic Places in 1975.

The 9.5-acre (3.8 ha) square is centered on the former intersection of Superior Avenue and Ontario Street. Cleveland's four tallest buildings, Key Tower, 200 Public Square, the Sherwin-Williams Headquarters, and the Terminal Tower, face the square. Other landmarks adjacent to Public Square include the 1855 Old Stone Church and the former Higbee's department store made famous in the 1983 film A Christmas Story, which has been occupied by the Jack Cleveland Casino since 2012.

Originally designed as four separate squares bisected by Superior Avenue and Ontario Street, the square was redeveloped in 2016 by the city into a more pedestrian-friendly environment by routing most traffic around the square. The section of Ontario Street through the square was removed, while the section of Superior Avenue was rebuilt to only allow buses with stops for multiple bus lines of the Greater Cleveland Regional Transit Authority. The northern half of the square is mostly green space and includes a statue to reformist mayor Tom L. Johnson. The southern half is mostly a paved plaza area with a cafe and water feature adjacent to the 125-foot-tall (38 m) Soldiers' and Sailors' Monument and a statue of Moses Cleaveland.

== History ==
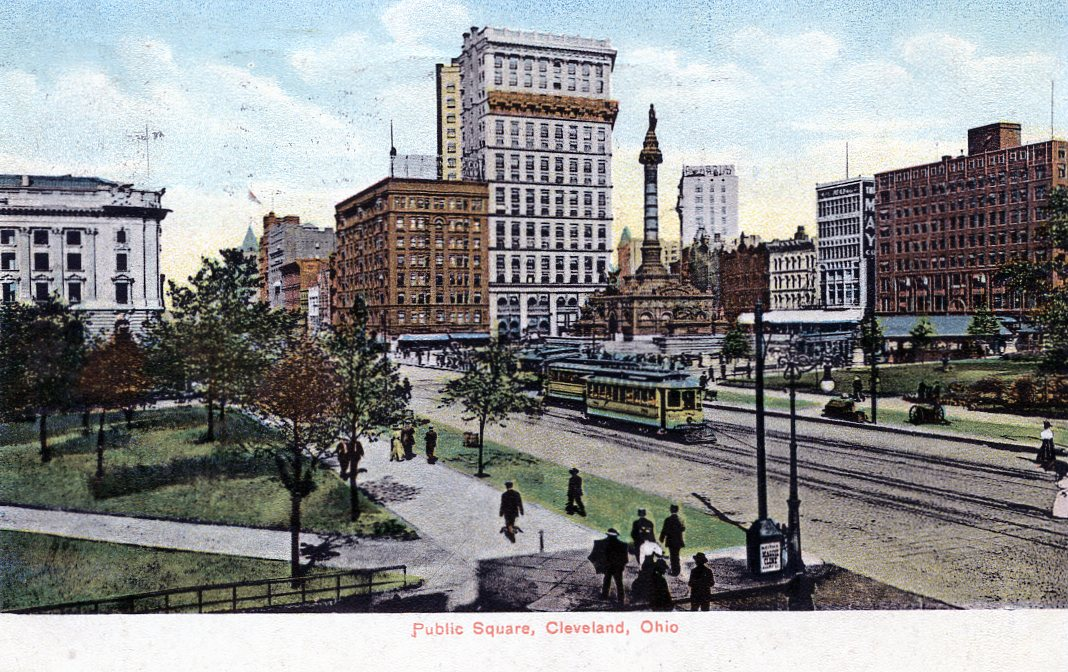
Postcard of Public Square in the 1910s

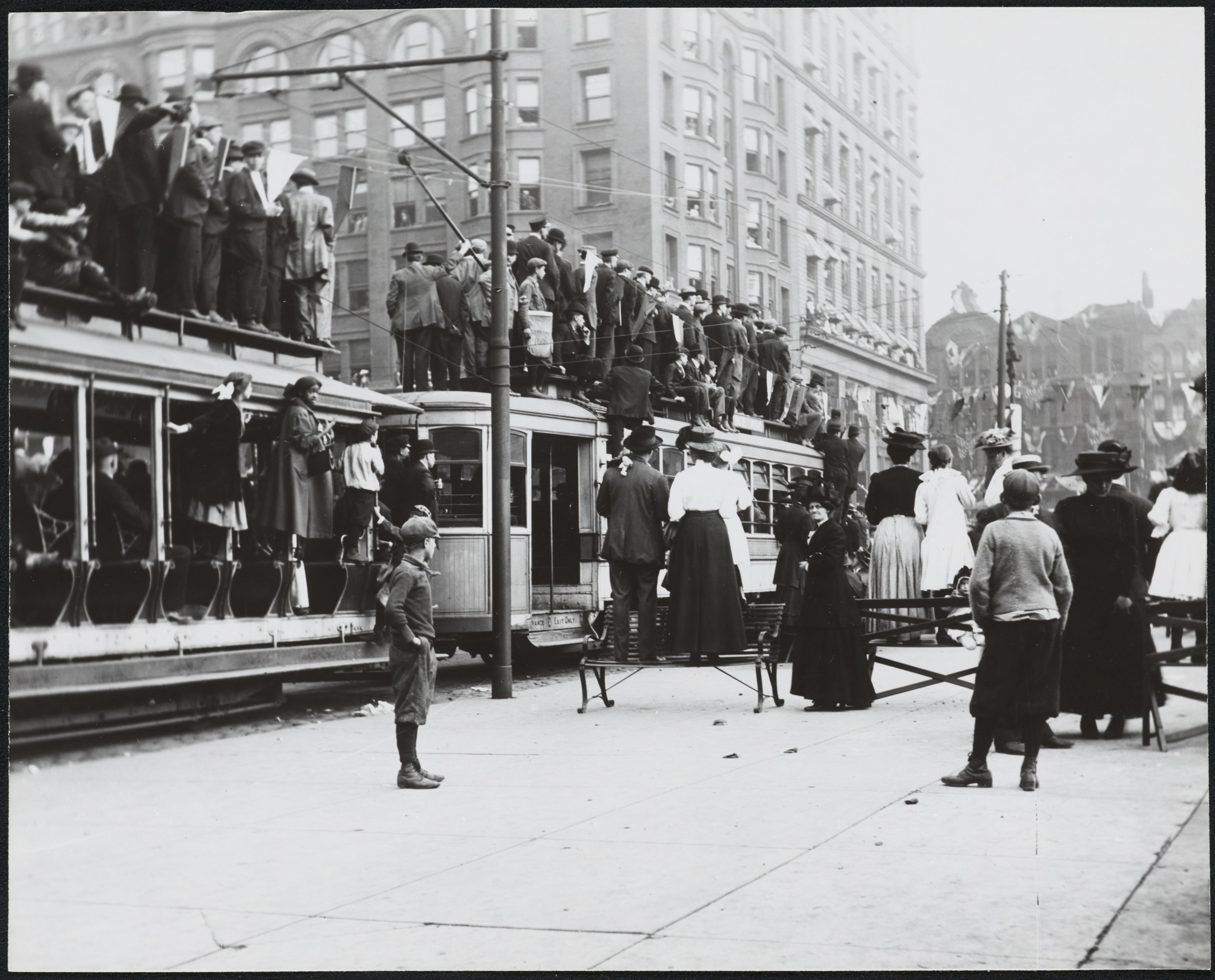
Parade spectators at the square, 1910

Public Square was part of the Connecticut Land Company's original plan for the city, which were overseen by Moses Cleaveland in the 1790s. The square is signature of the layout for early New England towns, which Cleveland was modeled after. While it initially served as a common pasture for settlers' animals, less than a century later Public Square was the height of modernity, when in 1879 it became the first street in the world to be lit with electric street lights, arc lamps designed by Cleveland native Charles F. Brush. A portion of Abraham Lincoln's state funeral took place at Public Square on April 28, 1865; the public viewing lasted from 10:00 a.m. to 10:00 p.m.

The square was added to the National Register of Historic Places on December 18, 1975.

Until the construction of the Sherwin-Williams Headquarters, a parking lot faced the northwest quadrant of the square for decades. A 12-story building, which was built on the spot in 1913, was demolished in 1990 to make way for the new Ameritrust Center, an 1,197-foot (365 m) skyscraper designed by New York's Kohn Pedersen Fox. Before construction began, Ameritrust was acquired by Society Bank, which was also planning to construct and subsequently relocate to a new building on Public Square—Key Tower (formerly known as Society Center). Because Society did not need two skyscrapers, plans for the Ameritrust building across the square were scrapped.

Other buildings that face the square include 55 Public Square (1958), 75 Public Square (1915), the Society for Savings Building (1890), Metzenbaum Courthouse (1910), the former May Company department store (1914), the Park Building (1903), and the Hotel Cleveland (1918). The demolished Cuyahoga Building (1893) and Williamson Building (1900) formerly stood on the site of 200 Public Square.

Public Square is often the site of political rallies and civic functions, including a free annual Independence Day concert by the Cleveland Orchestra. At the Balloonfest '86, close to 1.5 million balloons rose up from Public Square, engulfing the Terminal Tower and setting a world record.

A light and sound show called Illuminate CLE hosted by Destination Cleveland began in 2025.

=== 2010s renovation ===
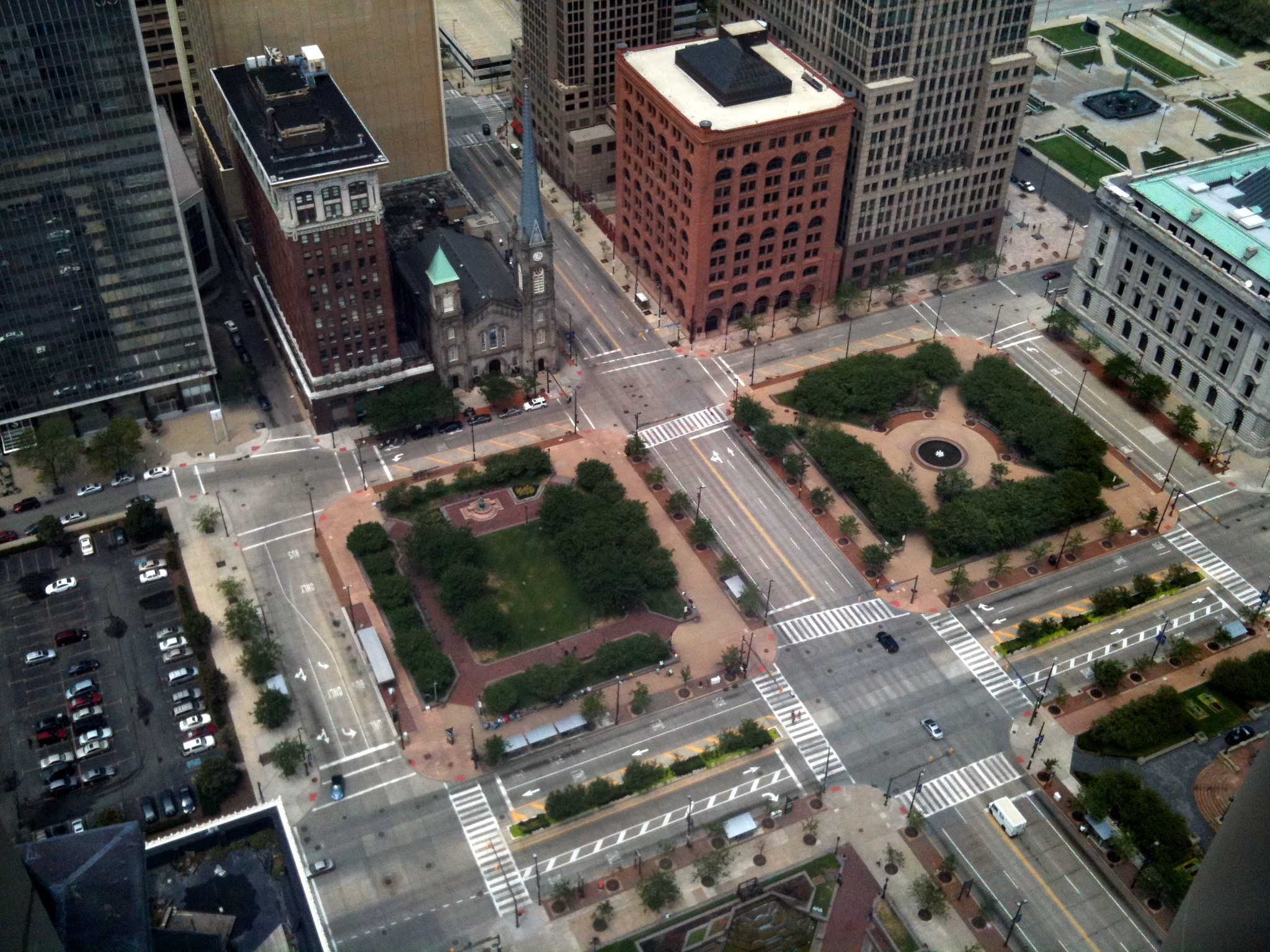
Partial view of the square in 2010 in its previous configuration from Terminal Tower

In collaboration with landscape architect James Corner, the city in 2009 began to explore concepts for a redesign of the square. In October 2011, Cleveland mayor Frank Jackson proposed his plan to redevelop the square, which included closing Superior Avenue and Ontario Street to create a large green space in the center. On October 23, 2014, the Cleveland Landmarks Commission approved a plan which closed Ontario Street but kept Superior Avenue open to bus traffic, and kept the Soldiers' and Sailors' Monument prominent.

The project began construction on March 9, 2015, and was officially opened on June 30, 2016. Public Square's development was showcased during the Cleveland Cavaliers championship parade as a welcome sight with much of the construction materials removed to display the renovation. At first, buses did not run along Superior Avenue as planned, but in order to avoid a $12 million repayment of grants to the Federal Transit Administration, the Greater Cleveland Regional Transit Authority agreed to run buses along it by March 2017. The city installed jersey barriers along Superior Avenue due to fears of terrorism, contrary to the original design. These barriers were removed on March 25, 2024.

A privately operated cafe, Rebol, located in the southwestern area of Public Square, opened in July 2016.

== Transportation ==
=== Road ===
Public Square is bounded by East Roadway and West Roadway at the western and eastern ends and by Rockwell Avenue and South Roadway at the northern and southern ends.

In total, ten U.S. and state routes meet at Public Square. It is the northern terminus of SR 3, SR 8, and SR 43; the western terminus of US 322, US 422, SR 14, and SR 87; and the northeastern terminus of US 42. US 6 passes through the square on Superior, and US 20 enters from the west on Superior and leaves via Euclid Avenue. US 21 also terminated at Public Square until that route was truncated to Marietta in 1967.

=== Public transit ===
Public Square is adjacent to the Tower City transit station, served by three RTA rail lines. The HealthLine, a bus rapid transit line that travels along Euclid Avenue, terminates at Public Square.

Historically, the square served as the terminus of several streetcar lines in Cleveland, including the Shaker Heights Rapid Transit and other interurban lines.

== Historical events and popular culture ==
- On April 28, 1865, the casket of President Abraham Lincoln was on public view in Public Square during his body's trip back to Illinois.
- On the evening of April 29, 1879, Charles F. Brush's new streetlights lit up Public Square for the first time utilizing a generator situated near the square itself.
- In 1881, President James A. Garfield lies in state in Public Square following his death
- In 2011, Public Square was transformed into a beer garden and street scene in Stuttgart, Germany, for the filming of The Avengers.
- An episode of American Ninja Warrior taped in Public Square in May 2017.
- Public Square was used as a filming location for James Gunn's Superman in July 2024.

== Gallery ==
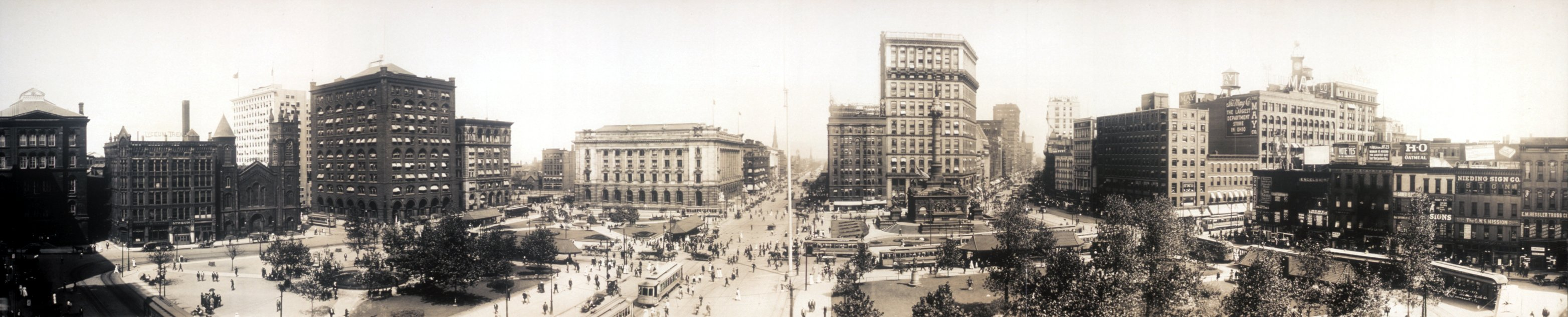
Public Square in 1912, facing east. The Old Stone Church is the third building on the left. The Soldiers' and Sailors' Monument is on the right, in front of the Williamson Building, which was later demolished for 200 Public Square.

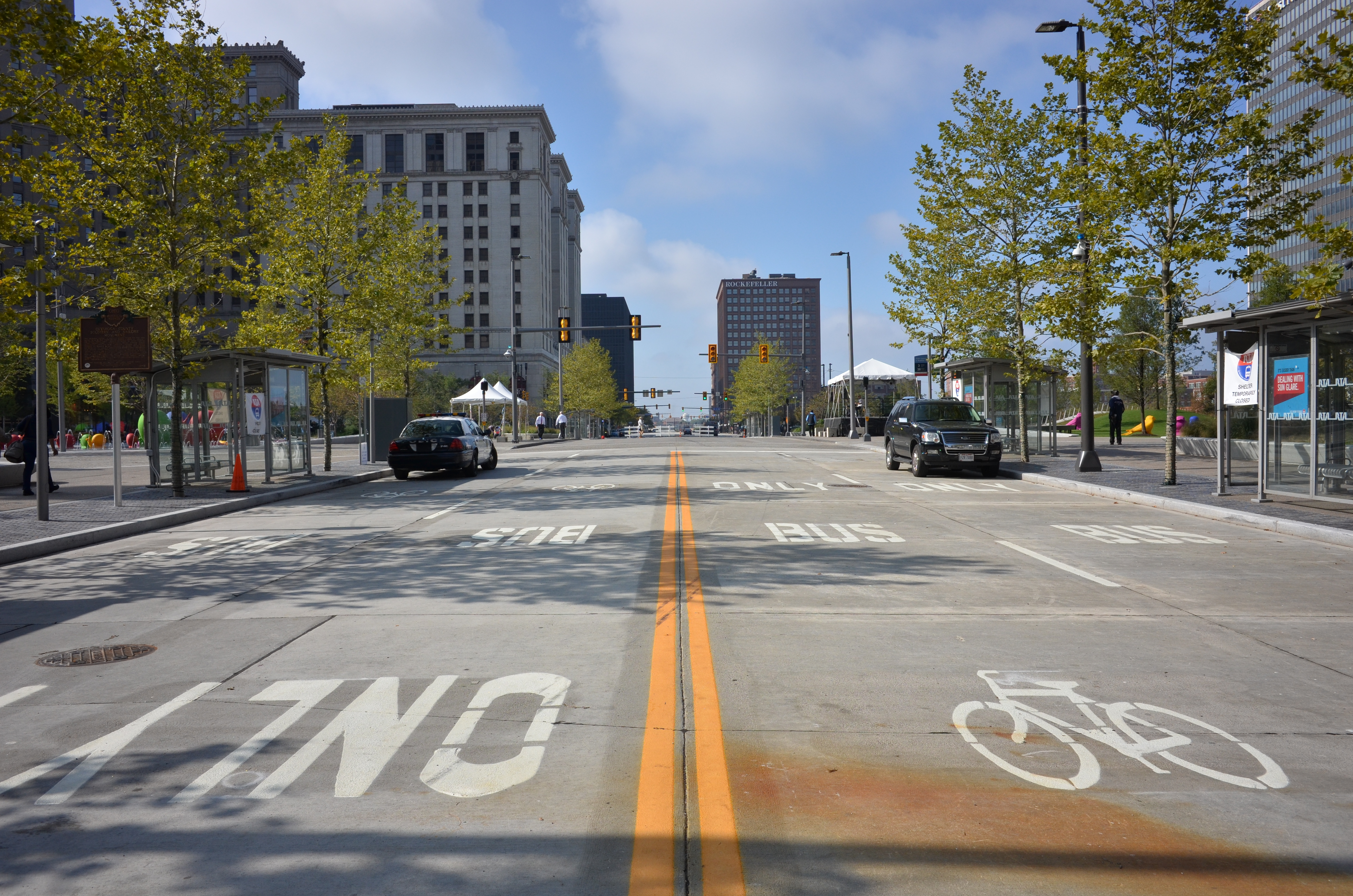
Public Square in 2016 facing west on Superior Avenue's vehicle-free bus/bike lanes

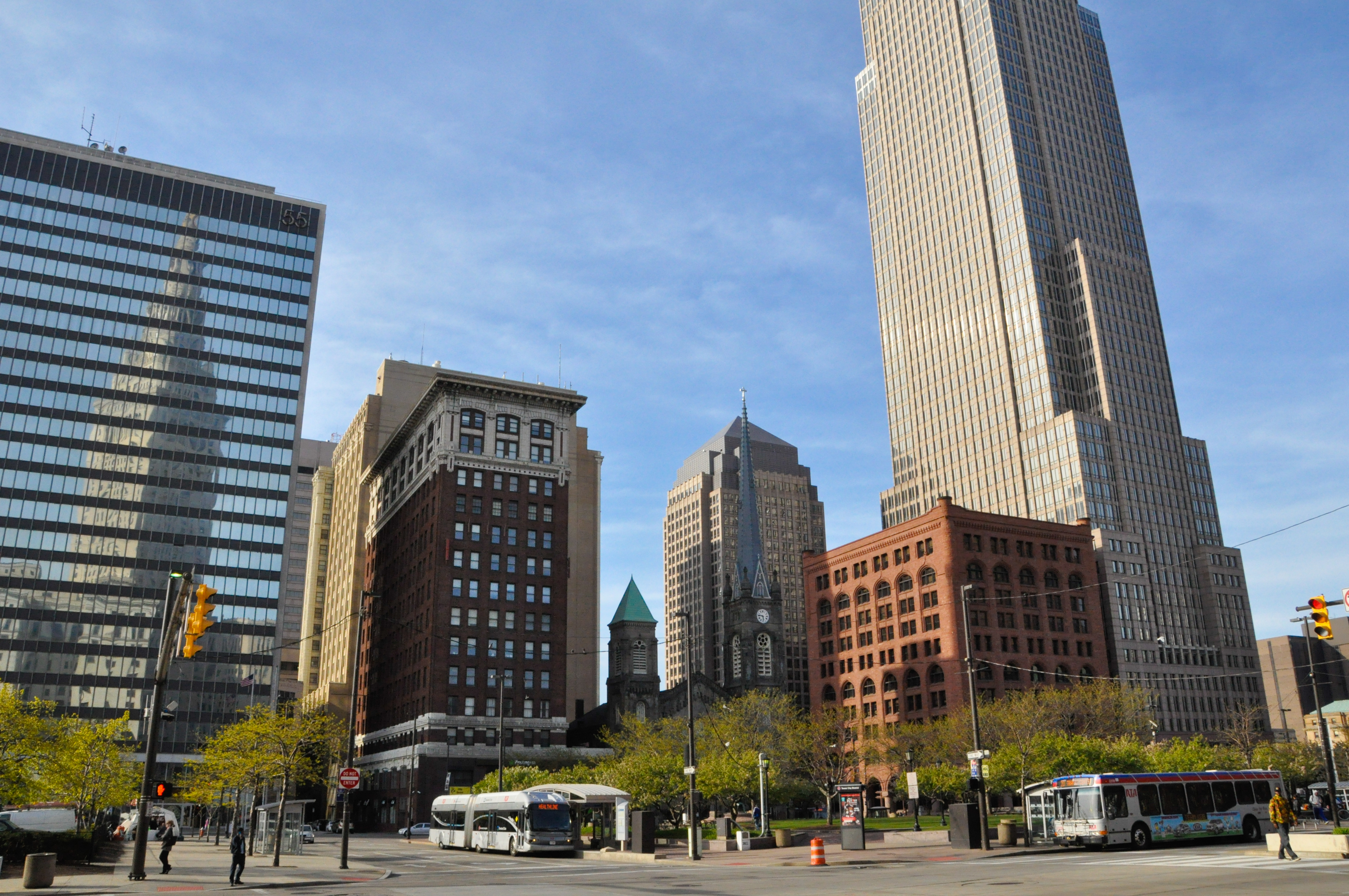
The north side of Public Square in 2012

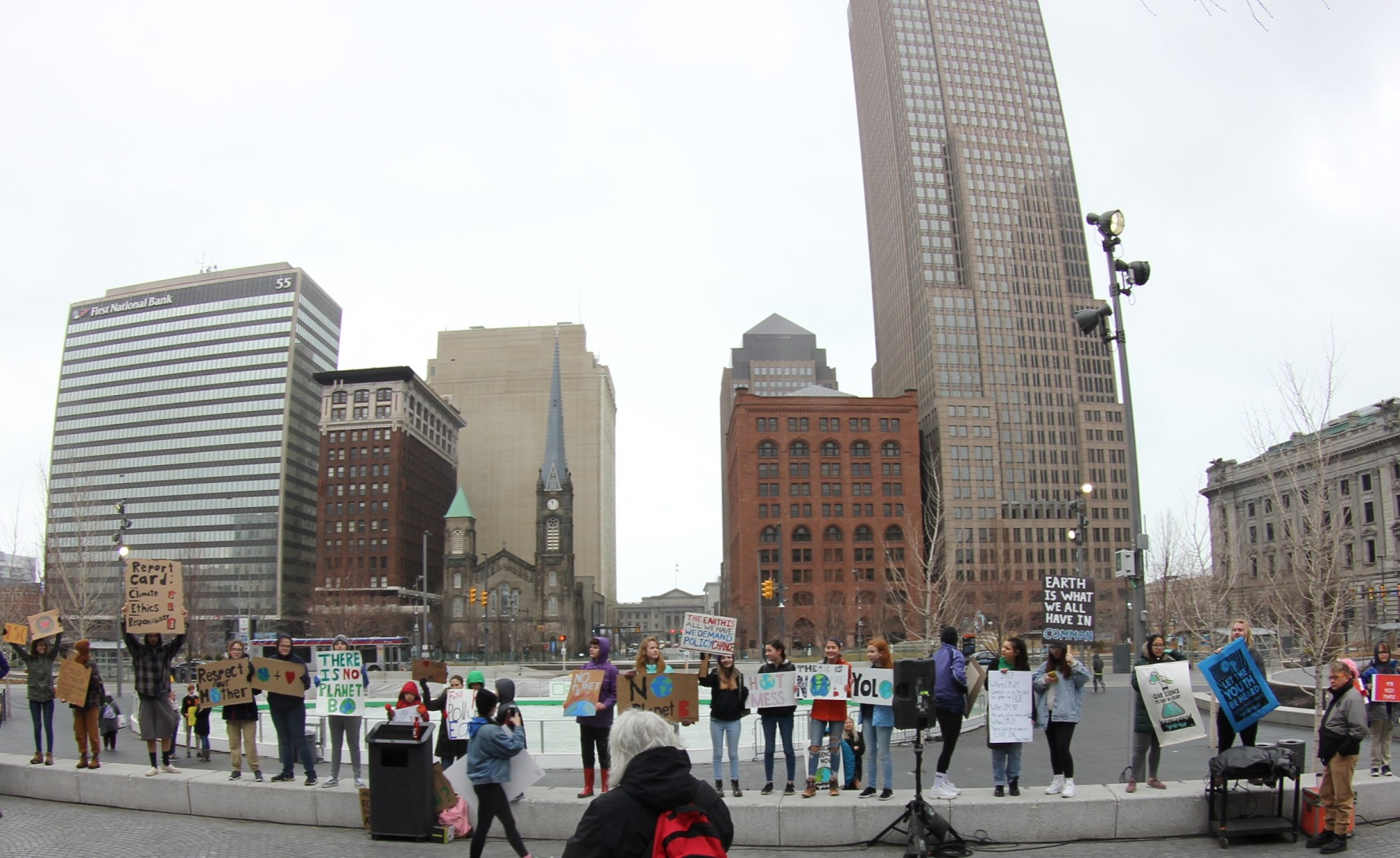
School strikes for climate protest in Public Square (March 15, 2019)

== See also ==
- Tower City Center
- The Mall
