= Sherwin-Williams =

American paint and coating company

The Sherwin-Williams Company

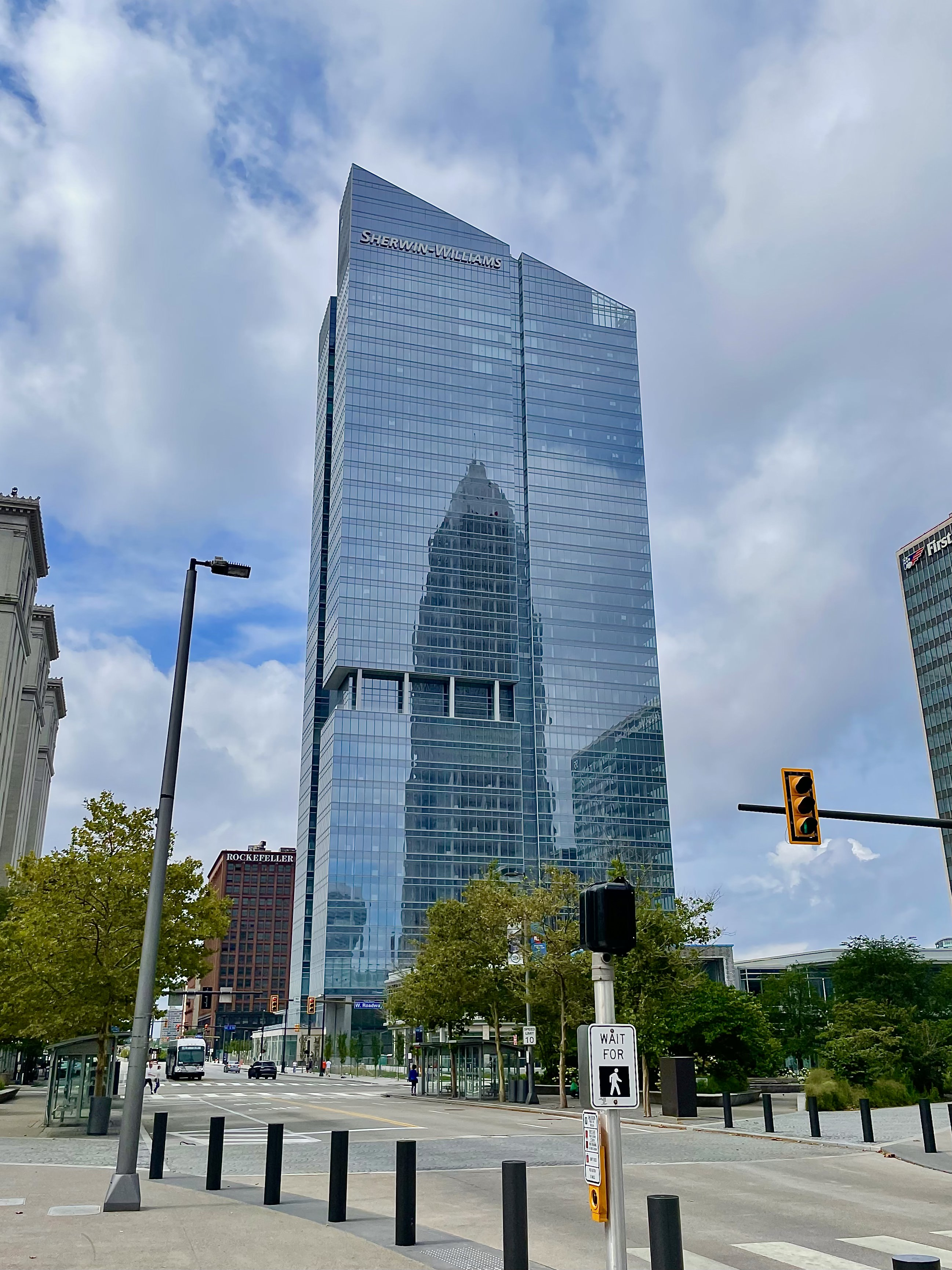
- Sherwin-Williams Headquarters in Cleveland
- Type: Public
- Traded as: NYSE: SHW; DJIA component; S&P 500 component
- Industry: Chemicals
- Founded: 1866; 160 years ago
- Founders: Henry Sherwin; Edward Williams
- Headquarters: 1426 West 3rd Street, Cleveland, Ohio, United States
- Number of locations: 4,853 stores (2025)
- Area served: Worldwide
- Key people: John G. Morikis (Retired, Executive Chairman); Heidi G. Petz (Chair, President and CEO); Ben E. Meisenzahl (SVP and CFO)
- Products: Caulks; Chemicals; Coatings; Decorative paints; Industrial finishing products; Sealants; Stains
- Brands: List: Cabot; Cisco; Duckback; Dupli-Color; Dutch Boy; Geocel; Huarun; Krylon; Minwax; North American Grocery Co; Pratt & Lambert; Purdy; Ronseal; Solver; Sysco; Thompson's WaterSeal; Valspar; White Lightning
- Revenue: ▲US$23.6 billion (2025)
- Operating income: ▲US$3.81 billion (2025)
- Net income: ▼US$2.57 billion (2025)
- Total assets: ▲US$25.9 billion (2025)
- Total equity: ▲US$4.60 billion (2025)
- Number of employees: 64,249 (2025)
- Divisions: Paint Stores Group; Consumer Brands Group; Performance Coatings Group
- Subsidiaries: Valspar
- Website: sherwin-williams.com

Sherwin-Williams is an American paints and coatings company based in Cleveland, Ohio. It is primarily engaged in the manufacture, distribution, and sale of paints, coatings, floor coverings, and related products with operations in over 120 countries. It is the largest coatings company in the world by revenue.

The company is ranked 191st on the Fortune 500 and 453rd on the Forbes Global 2000. Sherwin-Williams has created more than 35,000 color names for paint over its history, and as of 2023, it has nearly 200 distinct shades of white classified as either warm or cool.

== History ==
Sherwin-Williams dates from 1866, when Cleveland bookkeeper Henry Sherwin invested in Truman Dunham & Co., a paint distributorship. After the partnership dissolved in 1870, he formed Sherwin, Williams, & Co. with Edward Williams and A.T. Osborn. For its first factory, in 1873 the company acquired a cooperage in Cleveland from Standard Oil.

Sherwin-Williams was incorporated in Ohio on July 16, 1884, two years after Osborn sold his interest in the company while retaining the retail operations. The company grew through acquisitions and expansions in the late 19th and early 20th century. In the early 1920s, the company became the largest coatings manufacturer in the U.S.

In 1875, Sherwin-Williams started selling ready-mixed paint. Previously, consumers bought paint ingredients that they themselves would mix together. In 1930, Sherwin-Williams moved its headquarters to Cleveland's Midland Building, where stayed for over 75 years.

In 1941, Sherwin-Williams introduced Kem-Tone, a water-based fast-drying interior paint and the Sherwin-Williams Roller-KoaterTM paint applicator. In 1996, the American Chemical Society named the product a National Historic Chemical Landmark.

Sherwin-Williams experienced a downturn in the 1970s, and Gulf and Western Industries unsuccessfully attempted to take over. The company recovered by fending off the raid and undergoing a series of acquisitions in the 1980s and 1990s, as well as divesting its non-coatings businesses. In 1995, it employed 18,000 people, including 3,200 in Ohio. By 2002, the company operated more than 2,500 stores.

In 2014, Sherwin-Williams offered to donate $1 million to the Angels Baseball Foundation if a home run ball landed in a giant paint can near the center-field fence of Angel Stadium in Anaheim, California on the fly, though the requirement the ball land on the fly was not noted on the billboard as the billboard simply stated "Angels home run in the can $1,000,000". On September 19, 2017, a home run ball landed in the can after bouncing. Some commentators were upset that a donation wasn't made "due to a lame technicality", causing a public relations embarrassment. In 2016, the first paint registered as microbicidal with the United States Environmental Protection Agency was brought to market by Sherwin-Williams.

In September 2019, the company announced that it would move its headquarters to a larger site, and in February 2020, confirmed it would remain in the Cleveland area. That month, the company also began work on a new R&D center in Brecksville, OH. The Sherwin-Williams Headquarters location was clarified in March 2020, with the company committing to constructing a new building complex, also in Downtown Cleveland. The downtown HQ was originally projected to open in 2023, but a construction pause due to the COVID-19 pandemic delayed the projected opening until 2024. The company invested $600 million (US) in its new facilities, providing working space for 3,500 employees.

In November 2020, the company fired employee Tony Piloseno, who'd amassed over 1.4 million viewers on his TikTok paint mixing channel, Tonesterpaints, for alleged misconduct. The company was criticized for their perceived mishandling of the situation with critics believing the company failed to realize the marketing opportunity they'd just lost. Piloseno received multiple offers of employment from Sherwin-Williams' industry rivals and took up a position with Florida Paints where he will have his own art studio and develop his own custom range of paints. Commentators pointed out the differing reaction the company had after going viral when compared to other companies such as Ocean Spray, who had positively reacted to going viral on the TikTok platform.

=== Acquisitions ===
In 1997, Sherwin-Williams officially acquired the Thompson-Minwax holding company for roughly $830 million. In 2004, Sherwin-Williams acquired Paint Sundry Brands for $295 million and Duron Inc. for $253 million. In June 2007, Sherwin-Williams announced that it had completed an acquisition of M.A. Bruder & Sons, a manufacturer and distributor of paints and coatings. On July 6 2011, Sherwin-Williams acquired Leighs Paints, based in Bolton UK, manufacturers of intumescent and high performance industrial coatings. In June 2012, Sherwin-Williams acquired Geocel Holdings Corp for an undisclosed amount. In March 2016, Sherwin-Williams acquired the Valspar Corporation for $11.3 billion.

In April 2022, the company announced that it had completed an acquisition of the European industrial coatings business of Sika AG. In June 2022, the company agreed to acquire Gross & Perthun GmbH. This Germany-based distributor primarily manufactures and distributes coatings for the heavy equipment and transportation industries.

== Corporate structure ==
The company was founded by Henry Sherwin and Edward Williams in Cleveland in 1866. The company operates through three segments: The Paint Stores Group, Consumer Brands Group, and Performance Coatings Group.

=== Paint Stores Group ===
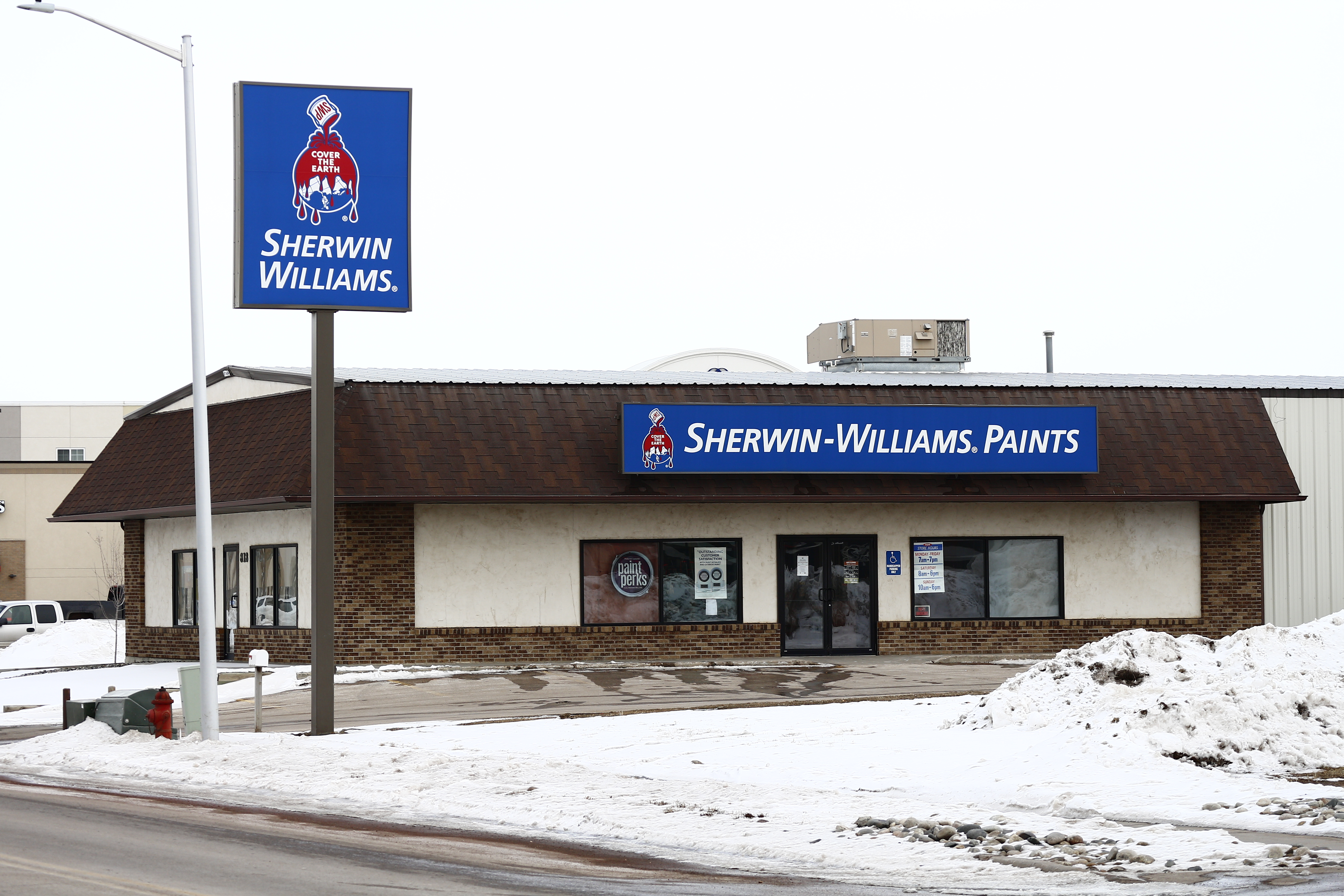
A Sherwin-Williams Paints in Gillette, Wyoming

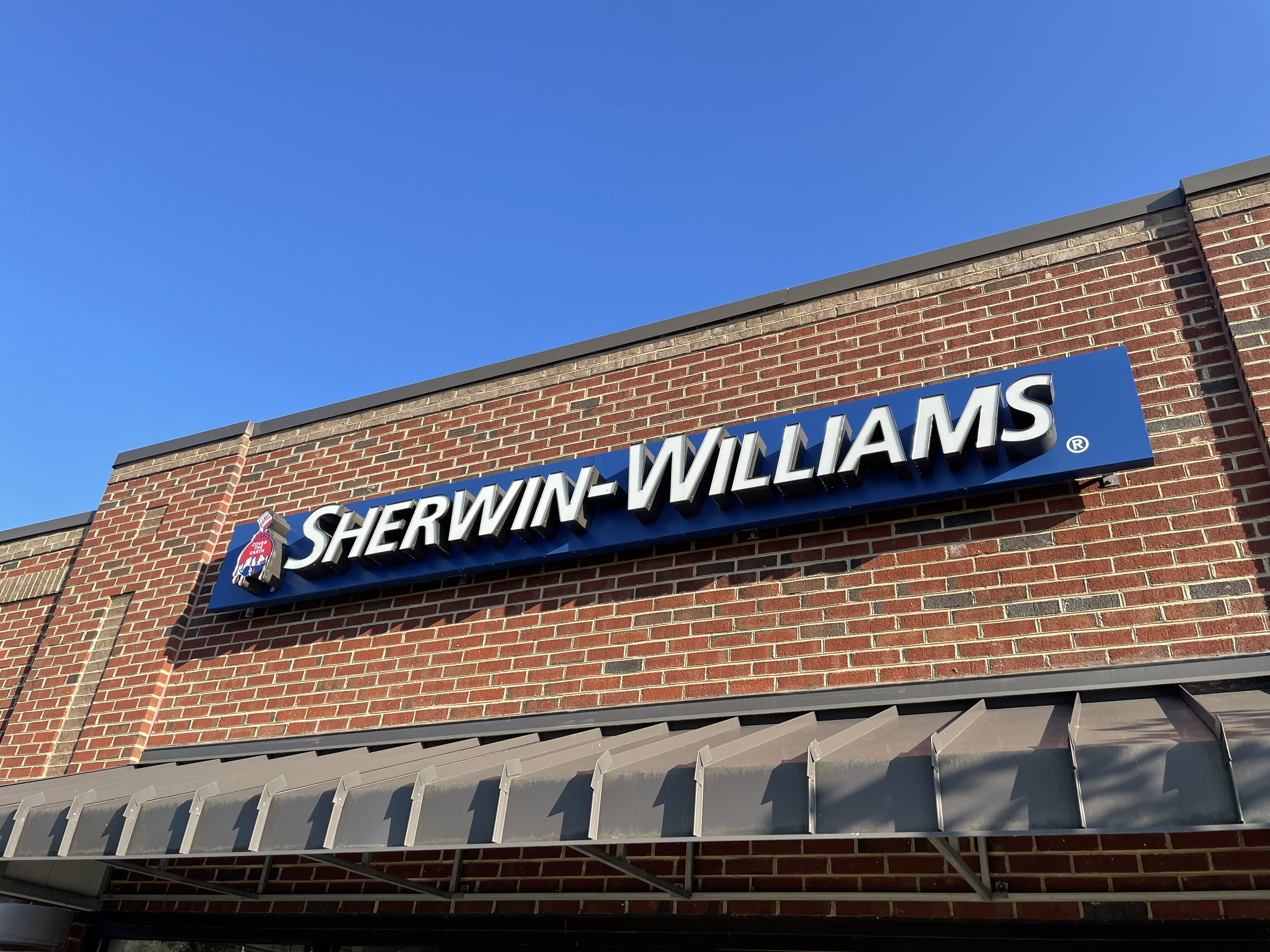
Sherwin Williams store in Kannapolis, North Carolina

Paint Stores Group, formerly the Americas Group, was the first section of the company to be established, in 1866. These stores market and sell Sherwin-Williams branded architectural paints and coatings, industrial and marine products, floorcovering, and related equipment and supplies. As of the end of 2019, Paint Stores Group had expanded to 4,758 stores, including more than 135 floorcovering centers.

=== Consumer Brands Group ===
The Consumer Brands Group develops, manufactures, and distributes various paints, coatings, and related products. Brands include Cabot, Dupli-Color, Dutch Boy, Geocel, Huarun, HGTV Home, Krylon, Minwax, Purdy, Ronseal, Thompson's WaterSeal, Valspar, and White Lightning to third party customers in addition to overseeing the operations maintained by the Paint Stores Group.

Formby's refinishing products were acquired by Sherwin-Williams with the Thompson Minwax acquisition in 1997. They kept the Formby's brand alive as a specialty line with the Minwax distribution network until 2022.

On August 28, 2007, Sherwin Williams purchased Columbia Paint & Coatings. On July 6, 2011, Sherwin-Williams acquired Leighs Paints, based in Bolton UK, manufacturers of intumescent and high performance industrial coatings. In late 2012, Sherwin Williams began the process of purchasing the Comex Group. Comex was the 4th largest paint manufacturer in North America. After Mexican antitrust regulators voted against the deal twice, Sherwin-Williams bought Comex's US and Canadian divisions for $165 million on September 16, 2013. PPG, US-based paint and coating company, acquired Comex's Mexican division for $2.3 billion. In March 2016, it was announced that Valspar would be acquired for $9.3 billion. The merger was finalized June 1, 2017.

=== Performance Coatings Group ===
The Performance Coatings Group sells coatings and finishes to industrial, wood furniture manufacturing, marine, packaging, and automotive markets in more than 110 countries. The Group also contains Valspar's automotive refinishes business.

== Legal and regulatory issues ==
=== Lead paint ===
In January 2014, the Santa Clara County Superior Court ruled that Sherwin-Williams, NL Industries and ConAgra were jointly and severally liable for $1.15 billion, to be paid into a lead paint abatement fund to be used to remove lead paint from older housing. The judge ruled that the paint companies manufactured, marketed, and sold lead paint without disclosing the health risks to the consumers in spite of "actual and constructive knowledge that it was harmful". In March 2014 Sherwin-Williams was denied a new trial. In July 2019, a $305 million settlement was reached.

In 2018, multiple counties in Pennsylvania sued Sherwin-Williams over lead paint matters. Sherwin-Williams attempted to counter-sue, but that attempt was denied in October 2019, and the denial was upheld in July 2020.

In 2026 The Plain Dealer newspaper of Cleveland published a five-part series on Sherwin-Williams' past use of lead in its paint called Our Sherwin-Williams Dilemma, produced using Sherwin-Williams' document archive.

=== Pollution ===
On April 9, 2018, Milwaukee Mayor Tom Barrett and representing attorneys uncovered that Sherwin-Williams tried to "shift the blame to contaminated water in an effort" to avoid having to pay tens of millions of dollars in settlements. Almost 170 children had been affected by the potentially fatal lead poisoning.

In December 2019, Sherwin-Williams was sued by New Jersey for discharging industrial waste from three sites and failing to disclose the pollution to the New Jersey Department of Environmental Protection.

=== Underpayment of wages ===
In May 2020, Sherwin-Williams agreed to pay $3.6 million to settle a lawsuit brought by workers in California alleging underpayment of wages and failure to provide obligatory meal or rest breaks.

=== Water-based paint ===
Starting in 2008, businessman John Tyczki entered into an agreement with Sherwin-Williams on the basis of assurances provided by Sherwin-Williams about its water-based paint products. When the products failed to live up to these assurances, causing ongoing problems for his business, Tyczki sued Sherwin-Williams and was awarded $2.88M.

== See also ==
- Lead hydrogen arsenate § Safety, depicts an ad for a now-banned Sherwin-Williams pesticide
- Pollution in Door County, Wisconsin § Soils and groundwater
