= Cleveland Convention Center =

Former building in Cleveland, Ohio, United States

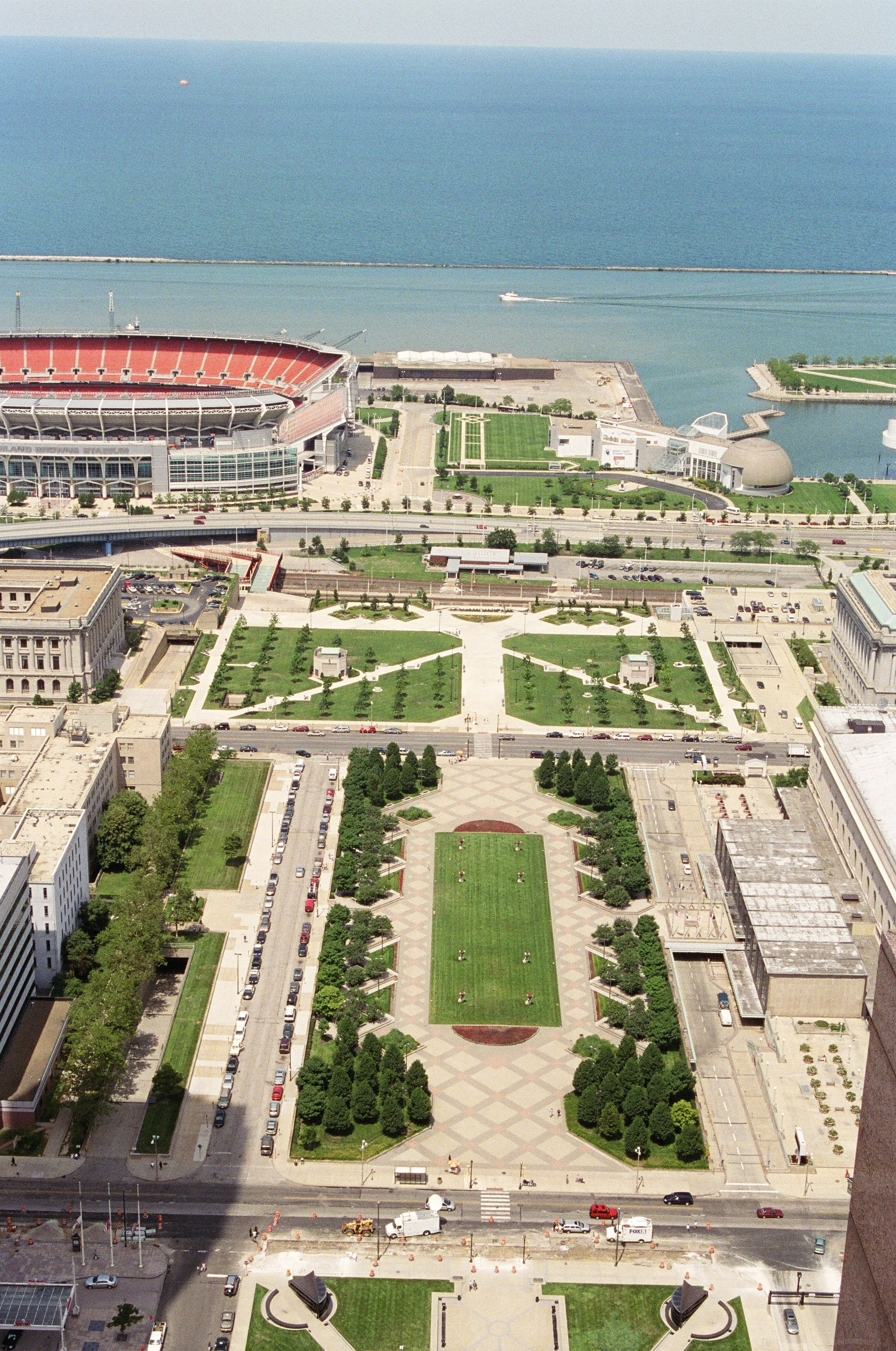
- Cleveland Convention Center below Mall B in 2005; the reception pavilion is at right
- Interactive map of Cleveland Convention Center
- Address: 500 Lakeside Avenue
- Location: Cleveland, Ohio, U.S.
- Coordinates: 41.503082°N 81.696004°W
- Owner: Cuyahoga County, Ohio
- Operator: Cleveland Convention Center and Visitors' Bureau

Construction
- Built: 1960 to 1964
- Opened: May 1964
- Renovated: 1987
- Expanded: 1987
- Demolished: 2011
- Cost: US$15 million

The Cleveland Convention Center was located in downtown Cleveland, Ohio, United States. Built by the city of Cleveland beneath the Cleveland Mall adjacent to Public Auditorium, it was completed in 1964. Plans for the convention center were first made in 1956, but voters twice rejected initiatives to fund construction before approving a bond levy in November 1963. A local private foundation donated several million dollars to beautify the mall atop the convention center with a reflecting pool and fountains.

Construction was plagued by issues with ground water, protests, strikes, and cost overruns. A major dispute broke out between civil rights activists and labor unions in the summer of 1963. Nevertheless, the convention center informally opened on May 11, 1964, almost three months ahead of schedule. A formal dedication on August 28, 1964, was followed an 11-day festival.

The Cleveland Convention Center underwent a major $28 million renovation from 1983 to 1987. Substantially reconfigured, although not larger, it reopened on October 5, 1987. The convention center was demolished in 2011, and the larger Huntington Convention Center of Cleveland built in the same underground location. It opened on June 7, 2013.

== 1957 push for a convention center ==
=== The "international center" ===
Some time in 1954, Cleveland Mayor Anthony J. Celebrezze asked local architect R. Franklin Outcalt of the Cleveland architectural firm of Outcalt Guenther & Associates to work with him on a place for revitalizing the Cleveland Mall and lakefront near it. Outcalt agreed to donate his services for free. On May 29, 1956, Celebrezze and Outcalt unveiled their preliminary plan before a local committee supporting the International Geophysical Year. The plan proposed an "international center" which would lead from Public Auditorium's exhibition space under Mall C (the northernmost part of the Cleveland Mall) over the Cleveland Memorial Shoreway and New York Central Railroad tracks and toward Cleveland Stadium. The center would be primarily exhibition space, although an underground parking garage would be included. The plan also called for an 18-story hotel on land east of E. 9th Street, a 30-story office building (Note: Its location was north of what was then the Cleveland Press building, now the location of the North Point Office Building and Tower.) with space set aside for companies engaged in international trade and representatives of foreign governments, an above-ground hall (Note: It would be built north of the Cuyahoga County Courthouse, on a structure built over the railroad tracks.) with permanent exhibits about international trade, an outdoor amphitheater, (Note: Its location and size were not specified.) a swimming pool with a restaurant overlooking it, (Note: Its location was not specified.) a plaza (Note: It would be located atop the section built over the railroad tracks. This area was an extension of Mall C, and a new area north of City Hall.) surrounded by stores selling foreign goods, and a reflecting pool. (Note: It would be built atop Mall B.) The plan also called for moving sidewalks on E. 9th Street between Lakeside Avenue and Euclid Avenue, and another running down W. Mall Drive from Lakeside Avenue to Rockwell Avenue and Public Square. Celebrezze said he would ask the Cleveland City Council for funds to conduct a preliminary study of the plan. But no such request was made.

In January 1956, New York City real estate developer William Zeckendorf ran into Celebrezze at the meeting of the American Municipal Association. Celebrezze invited Zeckendorf to his hotel room, where Celebrezze showed him plans for the "international center", hotel, and office building. Zeckendorf agreed to back the project financially and become its lead real estate developer if Celebrezze could win approval for the deal.

At a meeting on March 9, 1956, the board Cleveland Convention and Visitors Bureau (CCVB) approved a resolution asking the city to fund the construction of a new convention center to replace or augment Public Auditorium. Mayor Celebrezze responded by challenging the CCVB to come up with a plan. Dan B. Wiles, CCVB president, appointed Lee C. Howley, Vice President and General Counsel of the Cleveland Electric Illuminating Company (a local electricity provider), to appoint and lead a committee to develop this plan.

On April 28, 1956, the New York Coliseum opened in New York City. Prompted by the opening of the convention center, and by comments from leaders of the Cleveland Convention and Visitors Bureau (who indicated the city was losing convention business due to the small size of Public Auditorium), Cleveland City Council member Joseph Horwitz introduced a resolution in May to require the city to study the construction of a new convention center. In June, Mayor Celebrezze proposed that the "international center" be built as the new convention center. Celebrezze's proposal enlarged the scheme by having the building extend toward the Lake Erie shore, and extending an ell eastward over the space then occupied by stadium parking lots. This structure would be three stories tall, and have parking for 4,000 vehicles. Celebrezze used mayoral funds to hire Outcalt to conduct a feasibility study of the project.

=== Competing plans ===
On April 19, 1957, Council President Jack P. Russell and Council member Wilson M. Latkovic introduced legislation to establish a 20-person committee to study a new site, bounded by E. 6th and 9th Streets, St. Clair Avenue, and Lakeside Avenue. Spurred by Russell, the city council also began considering Horwitz's bill in late April 1957. Two months later, The Plain Dealer estimated that the cost of purchasing land and demolishing the existing buildings to implement the Russell plan would cost close to $2.5 million ($29,605,263 in 2025 dollars), which the newspaper characterized as exorbitant. Undeterred, Russell introduced legislation to authorize construction of a $16 million ($189,473,684 in 2025 dollars) convention center designed by local architect Robert A. Little. Little's proposed exhibition hall was two stories high, had rooftop parking for 500 cars, and contained 627,000 square feet (58,300 m^{2}) of space (which would have made it the largest convention center in the world.) Russell's bill proposed a $5 million ($57,316,351 in 2025 dollars) bond issue, to go before voters in November 1957, to begin construction on the hall.

Russell's study commission bill passed the council, and on May 14 Mayor Celebrezze established the Heart of Cleveland Development Committee to study these and other proposals for improving the downtown area. (Note: The Heart of Cleveland Development Committee was appointed by Mayor Celebrezze to advise on the siting and design of the convention center. It consisted of 10 council members and 10 business leaders.)

On July 2, 1957, local civic promoter William Ganson Rose promoted his own convention center concept, a $15 million ($171,949,052 in 2025 dollars), 300,000-square-foot (28,000 m^{2}) structure on the Cleveland Mall with three below-ground floors. But his proposal was seen as a non-starter, as the Russell bill had already been adopted by the city council.

On July 16, the city council voted 25-to-4 (with another four council members not present) to put a $15 million ($171,949,052 in 2025 dollars) convention center bond issue on the November 1957 ballot. The vote was preceded by testimony from Outcalt, who presented the new convention center as part of his 1956 proposal for lakefront revitalization. The plan still included a new hotel, a now-34-story office building, and a now-3,800-space parking garage. (Note: Outcalt said 1,650 parking spaces would be provided in a basement garage below the convention center's main exhibition hall and on the convention center's roof. The remaining parking spaces would be provided by building a two-story parking garage beneath Willard Park, adjacent to City Hall on the north side of the project, and a three-story aboveground parking garage on the convention center's west side.) The new 700,000-square-foot (65,000 m^{2}), single-level main exhibition hall would be built beneath Mall C. Outcalt also proposed a 320,000-square-foot (30,000 m^{2}) expansion of the exhibition space under Mall B and beneath Public Auditorium. The exhibit hall beneath Malls B and C would have moveable walls, to enable two large conventions to occur simultaneously, and meeting rooms capable of seating 8,000 people. Scaling back the 1956 plan, Outcalt proposed that only a small portion of the convention center bridge the railroad tracks, to permit convention exhibitors to ship their exhibits by rail to the site. (Note: Outcalt's plan also continued to include moving sidewalks and a restaurant overlooking a swimming pool. His "international trade mart" now was designed only to showcase Cleveland products and services, and the plaza stores were no longer designated solely for international goods. Outcalt had also added a luxury bar, a high-end restaurant, and a restaurant with lakeside view to the plan.) Following Outcalt, William Zeckendorf told the council of his plans to finance the project and build much of it.

Outcalt's proposal was criticized by architect Little, who argued it was cut off from the rest of downtown, mixed parking and exhibit space in the same building, used open space rather than demolishing old and decrepit buildings, was too hemmed in by its proposed hotel and office towers, did not provide for the expansion of City Hall or the Cuyahoga County Courthouse, failed to give the city a visual symbol of its progress (by being buried beneath the mall), and was both too big to be built swiftly and too little to provide the economic stimulus the city wanted. Despite his criticisms, a week later the Cleveland investment banking firm of Ball, Burge & Kraus said it would issue bonds or stock or a combination in order to finance construction of the hotel and office building. Both Outcalt and Little called for additional studies, and the Cleveland City Planning Commission hired consultants John T. Howard and Walter H. Blucher to provide a joint assessment of both plans.

=== Disagreement over Zeckendorf's involvement ===
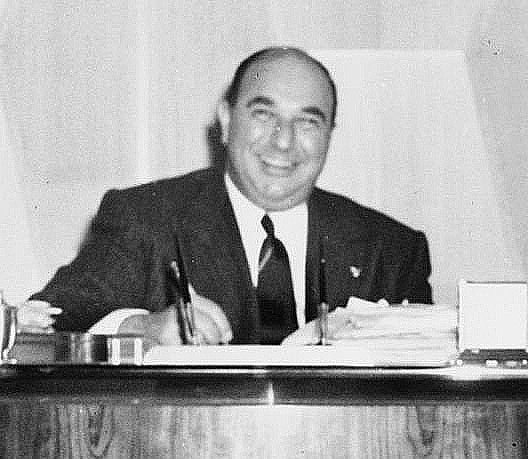
William Zeckendorf in 1952.

By August 1957, little public movement had occurred on the Celebrezze proposal. Zeckendorf sought a conference with the city council to get the project moving, and an advance team visited the city in mid-August to assess the real estate market, economic conditions, and other variables. The city council was concerned that Zeckendorf commit to specifics, and feared that the developer would agree to build but then scale back his plans in ways that would fail to achieve the hoped-for redevelopment goals. Zeckendorf's mounting interest brought an agreement on these issues on August 15. He signed a contract with Mayor Celebrezze in which he agreed to build a 1,000-to-1,500 room hotel, a 750,000-square-foot (70,000 m^{2}) office building, and a "trade mart" at a total cost of $45 million ($515,847,156 in 2025 dollars)—but only if voters approved the bond issue financing construction. In addition, Zeckendorf agreed to construct a 16-to-25 story apartment building with between 1,500 and 3,000 units east of the convention center once the other buildings were completed. (Note: The apartment building's site was not determined, but would be somewhere between E. 9th and E. 18th Streets, between Lakeside Avenue and Superior Avenue.)

Political complications began to interfere with the project. Celebrezze had not involved in the council in the negotiations, and the city council now threatened to balk at the approving the project. Celebrezze wanted to establish a group of businessmen and civic leaders to promote the bond issue to voters (who had a habit of defeating such referendums), but had to hold off until the council acted. This placed passage of the bond issue in jeopardy. Moreover, the two consultants hired earlier that summer had yet to issue their report. The city council appeared supportive of the project, but this soon changed. Councilman Russell withdrew his competing proposal for a convention center, after being convinced by other council members that competing plans would hurt the bond issue vote. But the council declined to support the group promoting the bond issue. This angered John A. Green, chairman of Ohio Bell, whom Celebrezze had asked to lead the promotional group. Green announced he would not do so unless disputes over the convention center were resolved. (Note: In part, the council was upset with Celebrezze for pushing for a special bond levy in 1956 (which passed) and then not using all the funds.)

Other approvals for the convention center proceeded. On August 23, City Planning Director Eric Grubb approved of the convention center plan and recommended its adoption by the City Planning Commission. (Note: The plans now called for 2,300 parking spaces in the air rights structure over the railroad tracks.) Grubb warned the city that further studies of studies of traffic congestion and revenue projections from the parking garages were needed, and that mass transit's role in the project had not been spelled out. He also felt that the non-convention center structures (collectively known as the "Seaway Center") might make for too much density, and warned the city against concluding that additional parking alone would solve downtown's ills. The same day that Grubb issued his approval, consultants John T. Howard and Walter H. Blucher issued their reports, which called for an exhibition hall design beneath Mall B which would provide for southward expansion at a later date. Outcalt also went public with a criticism, calling for a hotel 50 to 75 percent larger than Zeckendorf had agreed to.

By August 26, Celebrezze had begun to mend his rift with the city council. This came about in part after he agreed to lease land for the downtown development projects to Zeckendorf rather than sell them outright. But other political problems occurred. Many Cleveland-area real estate developers and construction firm were angry that they had never been given a chance to compete for the project. One businessman, I. R. Mintz of Mintz Construction Co., offered to finance the construction of a $25 million ($286,581,754 in 2025 dollars), 1,000-room hotel if the city would cancel the Zeckendorf hotel. Zeckendorf threatened to pull out of the project if it were opened to competitive bidding, but the city council bowed to local pressure and voted to do so on August 30.

=== Final bids and voter rejection ===
Written proposals were demanded from all bidders. Zeckendorf (who did not withdraw from the project) proposed construction a 30-story office building and 500-room hotel, and to build these simultaneously with the convention center. He pledged to put up $100,000 ($1,146,327 in 2025 dollars) of his own funds as earnest money, but demanded in turn that the city council must approve his plans, and that voters must approve not only the bond issue but a 99-year lease. (Note: Zeckendorf agreed to build the 2,300-space parking garage over the railroad tracks, but not the parking garage under Willard Park. Instead, the city of Cleveland agreed to build that garage.) Outcalt was the only other individual to submit a proposal. His plan, called "Garden Gateway", was much smaller in scale. He agreed to build a convention center under Malls B and C, the parking garage over the railroad tracks, and a 500-room hotel. However, the plan called for constructing a 34-story office building as well as the trade mart and restaurants he had earlier proposed. His proposal also included the moving sidewalks.

Neither bid was considered by the city council. On November 5, 1957, Cleveland voters rejected the bond proposal by a vote of 75,231 to 69,453 (51.5 to 48.5 percent). A majority vote of 55 percent was needed for approval.

== 1958 push for a convention center ==
=== Plans for a convention center ===
On November 6, 1957, the day after voters rejected the proposed bond issue, Mayor Celebrezze met with officers of the Equitable Life Insurance Co. to assess its interest in financing the new convention center. Celebrezze told the press that he would push for a revised bond proposal to be placed on the November 1958 ballot, and that he might ask Cuyahoga County voters to approve the proposal as well. Celebrezze suggested that the revised proposal would cover not only the convention center but the hotel, office building, and plaza as well. To build support for the new push, Celebrezze met the following day with Council member Russell, Joseph E. Flannery of the Heart of Cleveland group, and Cuyahoga County officials. Russell and Flannery agreed that the bond proposal should go before all Cuyahoga County voters, not just city voters. Cuyahoga County officials asked that the city turn title Municipal Stadium and Public Auditorium over to the county in exchange for the county's support for the project. Russell suggested that Celebrezze scale back the size of the redevelopment, and Flannery agreed with his idea. Celebrezze was also told by others present at the meeting that the city should come up with a master plan for redeveloping downtown and for beginning a citywide urban renewal effort to show voters that the convention center would fit with this wider effort.

To allay voter concerns that the convention center would be more costly than estimated, the Cleveland City Council voted on November 25 to engage in a study of the proposed convention center site. The council gave preliminary approval (in a vote of 32-to-1) to seek a federal redevelopment loan which would pay for test borings, a financial feasibility study, a utility survey, the construction of an architectural model, and a structural engineering analysis, among other things. (Note: The federal government required the loan to be repaid only if the convention center were built.)

In May 1958, Otis & Co., a local investment firm, proposed constructing the convention center atop Cleveland Union Terminal, the railroad and mass transit station linked to Terminal Tower. The investment company pledged to build the hotel and office building if the city bought the terminal for $20 million ($223,183,391 in 2025 dollars). The Heart of Cleveland Development Committee agreed to consider the proposal, although Celebrezze opposed it.

Three weeks later, Cuyahoga County officials declined to put the convention bond proposal on their ballot. On June 20, Celebrezze submitted legislation to the city council requesting that a $15 million ($167,387,543 in 2025 dollars) convention center bond levy be placed on the November ballot. He also asked voters to approval an amendment to the city charter to permit the city to lease land for longer than 35 years. Celebrezze told the council that the city had six consultants working on both the convention center and Public Auditorium renovation: Consultants Blucher and Howard; Edmund N. Bacon, planning director for the city of Philadelphia; Dr. Harold Mayer, a consultant on transportation and port development at the University of Chicago; Arnold Vey, a traffic consultant with the Philadelphia firm of Simpson & Curtin; and John Ducey, an official with Real Estate Research Corp. (a Chicago firm). The council threatened to withhold final approval for the federal loan application. To ease council dissatisfaction, Celebrezze agreed to use leftover funds to make test borings for his preferred site. He also agreed to make test borings at the site preferred by Russell.

The Cleveland City Council voted 27-to-4 (with two abstentions) to give preliminary approval to the bond levy proposal on June 30. It also agreed to approve solicitation of the federal loan, with $25,000 to be spent making borings at the Celebrezze site, and $10,000 to be spent on making borings at the Russell site.

=== The bond levy campaign and voter rejection ===
Voter approval of the convention center bond levy was critical to winning investor participation in the rest of the Garden Gateway development. But political complications once more interfered with the ballot proposal. For years, municipal and county court judges had been pressing for a new courthouse and county jail. Cleveland had agreed to put a bond levy for both structures on the November ballot. But with the onset of the Recession of 1958, Celebrezze believed voters would turn down both proposals. To save the convention center, he suggested postponing the courthouse levy. Judges reacted with outrage, attacking the convention center bond levy as unnecessary. Council reaction was poor as well, with a majority of Cleveland City Council members agreeing that the convention center bond issue was now dead because of the recession.

On August 4, 1958, the city council gave final approval to put the convention center bond issue on the November ballot.

A new group, the Committee for Civic Progress, was formed to help promote the bond levy. Its members included 150 business, labor, real estate leaders. The group asked the City Council to send personal letters to their constituents, asking them to support the proposal. All but three council members agreed to do so. The Greater Cleveland Convention and Visitors Bureau also helped. It issued a study in which it claimed that the convention center would generate $24 million a year in new economic activity, and printed 300,000 leaflets to get the word out about the study's conclusions. Local radio and television stations donated time to the Committee for Civic Progress so it could run advertisements supporting the proposal.

Despite these efforts, on November 5, Cleveland voters turned down the bond levy by a vote of 109,395 to 103,925 (51.3 to 48.7 percent). Voters approved the charter amendment, however, by a vote of 113,460 to 93,962 (56.3 to 43.7 percent). (Note: Only a simple majority was needed to approve the charter amendment.)

== 1959-1960 push for a convention center ==
=== 1959 proposals and debate ===
The day after the 1958 bond levy failed, Celebrezze said he would not back a new bond issue in 1959 until further study of the convention center and other downtown redevelopment was complete. Council member Russell countered by saying that the convention center's site should be chosen before going to voters again, and he once more pushed for his preferred site to be selected. The Cleveland City Planning Commission also weighed in on the issue, and said it would also recommend a site soon.

Despite Celebrezze's opposition, the Cleveland City Council pressed forward on a new convention center. On March 1, 1959, legislation was introduced in council to permit leasing of Mall A for a 20-story, $20 million ($220,890,411 in 2025 dollars) hotel. As a starting point for discussion, the legislation proposed that the hotel have 1,000 rooms, a 2,500-seat ballroom, 10 below-ground levels, and a 300-car parking garage. The Plain Dealer noted that the council had also received proposals from local civic boosters and businesspeople advocating a $10 million extension of the Cleveland Mall over the railroad tracks, with a new exhibition hall (rather than full convention center) below it. Others suggested an even smaller project, a 500-space parking garage under Mall B without any expansion of convention facilities.

The Cleveland City Planning Commission tentatively approved the council's hotel plan, but also required that the city build new exhibition space for Public Auditorium and that the city finance all construction through a bond levy rather than current operating funds or an agreement with a developer. (Note: The news media later reported that city planning director Eric Grubb had opposed the hotel project in his testimony before the planning commission. Grubb argued that, rather than disturb the mall, dilapidated buildings should be purchased and demolished and a hotel built to replace them.) The planning commission recommended, but did not require, that the council issue $900,000 ($9,940,068 in 2025 dollars) in councilmanic bonds (Note: The Constitution of Ohio and various Ohio state statues limit the amount of debt which a local or county jurisdiction may issue without the approval of the voters. This is known as "unvoted debt", or "councilmanic debt".) to study the council bill, engage in planning, analyze how Mall B would be redesigned to accommodate the hotel, determine whether to underground pedestrian access tunnels should be built as part of the project, and to study whether extension of the mall northward over the railroad tracks was appropriate. The Cleveland Chamber of Commerce now came out in opposition to the council proposal. The council had been working with the Chamber of Commerce to raise $6 million ($66,267,123 in 2025 dollars) in cash financing for the project before the council would agree to put a bond levy before voters. But the business organization said it could not support the hotel project without it being part of a wider plan to redevelop downtown.

=== 1960 proposal and voter approval ===
Nearly 10 months passed before the Cleveland City Council again took action on a new convention center. Some time in late 1959 or early 1960, Plain Dealer reporter John A. Crawford suggested to Cleveland Convention and Visitors Bureau convention center planning group (Note: The group was led by CCVB chairman Lee Howley, and included local business leaders as well as Cleveland City Council members.)—which had been meeting for four years without approving a plan—that a new convention center be built below Mall B. The existing exhibition space beneath the mall would be demolished, and replaced by a convention center which would link to the existing exhibition space below-ground north of Lakeside Avenue between City Hall and the Cuyahoga County Courthouse. A new structure would be built on the west side of Public Auditorium to serve as a reception and entry hall for the convention center below.

The CCVB group proposed the idea to Mayor Celebrezze and the Cleveland City Council, who both strongly embraced it. On February 29, 1960, the council voted 31-to-1 to approve a resolution setting in motion planning studies for the Cleveland Mall. On May 10, at Celebrezze's behest, Council member Wilson Latkovic agreed to introduce legislation approving the Crawford/CCVB plan. The legislation provided for a $10 million ($108,830,146 in 2025 dollars) expenditure to build a 226,000-square-foot (21,000 m^{2}) convention center, with escalator connections to Public Auditorium's main arena and theater. The bill also called for nine meeting rooms to be built at the south end of the exhibition hall, and for the convention center's design to allow for extension northward over the railroad tracks. (Note: The northern extension, if approved, would add another 110,000 square feet (10,000 m^{2}) of exhibition space, and have additional parking garages on either side of it.) The Heart of Cleveland Development Committee agreed to review the CCVB proposal in time for a May 19 council meeting. A three-story, 500-space parking garage would be built below the south end of Mall B to provide parking.

The Heart of Cleveland Development Committee overwhelmingly approved of the plan, and on May 19 the council voted to send the plan to various council committees for review. By now, the proposal included not only $10 million ($108,830,146 in 2025 dollars) for the underground convention center for $15 million ($163,245,219 in 2025 dollars) for a restaurant and veterans' memorial building on Mall C and the parking garage. The council and Celebrezze agreed to pay R. Franklin Outcalt to draft preliminary architectural plans for the convention center.

Approval for the Crawford/CCVB plan was swift. On June 6, the council committees all favorably reported back to the Cleveland City Council, which approved a bond levy for the November 1960 ballot. Mayor Celebrezze established another citizens' group to promote the bond issue, and advertisements in favor of the levy promised that the convention center would generate up to $30 million a year ($326,490,439 in 2025 dollars) in economic activity.

On November 9, 1960, Cleveland voters approved the convention center bond levy by a vote of 161,225 to 104,677 (60.6 to 39.4 percent).

== 1961 construction issues ==
R. Franklin Outcalt of Outcalt, Guenther & Van Buren was hired as the convention center's chief architect. The firm designed a main exhibition hall with 208,000 square feet (19,300 m^{2}) of space, with 18 meeting rooms surrounding it on the south and west sides. City officials said they intended to break ground on the convention center in June 1961.

In March, the Leonard C. Hanna, Jr. Fund donated $2 million ($21,547,884 in 2025 dollars) to the city to landscape and add fountains to the surface of Mall B once construction of was complete. The fund hired New York City-based landscape architects Gilmore David Clarke and Michael Rapuano to design the site. Their proposal included a 100-by-300-foot (30 by 91 m) reflecting pool surrounded by 12 illuminated fountains. Clarke and Rapuano worked with R. Franklin Outcalt to integrate the pool into the convention center, so that it helped cool the air inside the hall. The Hanna Fund's donation included $1.5 million ($16,160,913 in 2025 dollars) for design, landscaping, and construction of the pool and fountains, and $500,000 ($5,386,971 in 2025 dollars) as part of a maintenance endowment. The Fine Arts Advisory Committee of the City Planning Commission unanimously approved the Hanna donation and the overall design of the convention center on April 6.

The city set June 14, 1961, as the deadline for the receipt of bids for the $1.75 million ($18,854,399 in 2025 dollars) site preparation and excavation contract. (Note: A later news article pegged the contract's cost at $1,777,000 ($19,145,295 in 2025 dollars).) The bid proposal required the contractor to dig to a depth of 40 to 53 feet (12 to 16 m), drive pilings 50 to 60 feet (15 to 18 m) into the earth, and lay the foundation while continuously draining water from the site. (Note: The water table was reached at 20 feet (6.1 m).) The foundation slab was specified to be 2.5 to 4.5 feet (0.76 to 1.37 m) thick (depending on location), and the site rimmed by a retaining wall 12 feet (3.7 m) high. Groundbreaking for the convention center occurred on July 17, 1961, and the following day the Hunkin-Conkey Construction Co. was awarded the excavation contract after bidding more than $200,000 ($2,154,788 in 2025 dollars) lower than its nearest competitor. Site preparation began on July 19. At that time, the city estimated that the convention center would be complete in January 1964.

As work progressed, Cuyahoga County demanded that additional pilings and bracing be placed against the County Administration Building (1219 Ontario Street). County engineers argued that excavation was so close and so deep next to the new building that it was endangering its foundation. The city agreed to make the changes (which also involved construction of a temporary retraining wall) on August 10, 1961, at a cost of $2,500 ($26,935 in 2025 dollars). Reinforcement pilings began to be emplaced the first week of September. These consisted of fifty 40-foot (12 m) high interlocking metal sheets sunk vertically into the ground. (Note: When it came time to remove the plates in November 1963, cranes and pile drivers could not remove them. A massive vibrating machine was able to work most of them loose, but a dozen sheets refused to come out. These were welded together and left in place to provide support for the buildings and foundation.)

By August 10, 1961, excavation work was two weeks ahead of schedule, and 80 percent complete. All foundation work was expected to be finished by December 1. Engineers said that digging would stop when it reached 18 feet (5.5 m) below grade, at which point 1,100 wells would begin a two-week period of draining water from the site. Once drainage was complete, the site would be excavated another 20 feet (6.1 m). Excavation was expected to end in mid-October. Pumping began on August 25, 1961. Initially, drainage went well. The water table dropped by 10 feet (3.0 m) by September 9, and excavation work was expected to resume on September 13, 1961. However, heavy silt prevented the wells from functioning correctly, and by October 10 excavation had still not resumed. A protracted dispute between Hunkin-Conkey and the city broke out. Hunkin-Conkey claimed that it knew the contractually specified method of dewatering the site would not work, but the city was insistent. (Note: Hunkin-Conkey blamed Outcalt, and said the architect's dewatering plan was "not prudent in their design".) The firm also expressed concern that the drainage system specified for below the foundation would not work, either. With 850 wellpoints in operation, the water table had been lowered 28 feet (8.5 m). Another 7 feet (2.1 m) remained, but only 7 US quarts (6.6 L) per minute were coming out of the wells, rather than the required 250 US gallons (950 L) per minute. The excavation was now six weeks behind schedule, incurring a $2,000-a-day loss ($21,548 per day in 2025 dollars). Hunkin-Conkey refused to incur additional costs, and demanded that the city or the architect pay for a new means of dewatering the site. But the city argued that the contract required Hunkin-Conkey to incur the cost, and that the company could have added more wellpoints or contracted out the dewatering but chose neither. Mayor Celebrezze suggested that Hunkin-Conkey merely install 200 more wellpoints, a relatively inexpensive solution that would cost between $4,000 and $6,000. But Hunkin-Conkey now claimed they had 1,100 wells in operation, and additional wellpoints would not matter. Hunkin-Conkey declined to install the wellpoints, and sarcastically asked the mayor to specify exactly where the wells should be installed. By December 2, 1961, there was still no movement on the drainage issue, and the project was two months behind.

Even as construction stalled, other aspects of the convention center project moved ahead. In mid-September, the Fine Arts Advisory Committee approved the landscape redesign of Mall B, the new reception pavilion, the 300-foot (91 m) long reflecting pool, and 10 fountains for the mall. Anemometers would be placed on the mall to monitor wind speed, and a computer would automatically lower the water level (or even turn off the fountains) during periods of high wind so that people nearby would not be doused with spray. The fountains would be heated in winter to prevent freezing, and colored lights would be used to illuminate the steam coming of the warm water. In addition, the maintenance trust established by the Hanna Fund agreed to place lights under all the trees on the mall, pay for lit and decorated cut Christmas trees to be put on the mall each December, and to constantly renew and replace the plantings during the nine-month growing season. For the reception pavilion, the Fine Arts Committee approved an exterior of dark-coated aluminum and light grey granite, with the long side of the structure a glass curtain wall. With the pavilion's design approved, the city anticipated issuing construction bids for the $9.3 million ($100,197,661 in 2025 dollars) structure in October. (Note: There was a suggestion made by United States civil defense officials that the exhibition hall be designed to serve as a fallout shelter. Mayor Celebrezze gave the suggestion the cold shoulder.)

On October 20, 1961, the site had its first serious industrial accident after 19-year-old Kenneth Kornaker was injured during a cave-in. He was listed fair condition.

=== The electricians' strike ===
A union dispute broke out at the site on July 31, 1961. Excavation continued past midnight most nights, and floodlights were needed to provide light for the trucks, workers, pump operators, and security purposes. Workers belonging to the International Brotherhood of Electrical Workers (IBEW) went out on strike after a non-union worker was given the job of turning the floodlights on and off. Mayor Celebrezze personally spoke with the head of the local IBEW union, but their initial talks were unfruitful. The electricians remained on strike.

As the city attempted to mediate the dispute, Hunkin-Conkey officials accused the union of featherbedding. The city proposed that since flipping a light switch was not a professional skill, that the late-night worker should only be barred from completing work begun during the day. This solution proved acceptable to the union, and workers returned to the site on August 5, 1961.

=== The Garden Valley protests ===
Fill removed from the convention center excavation site was trucked south across the city into the Kinsman neighborhood. There, it was used to fill in a portion of the valley of Kingsbury Run, a long-drained creek famous as the site of the first Standard Oil refinery. The area was poor and African American, with extensive public housing such as the Garden Valley Neighborhood House. Trucks often ran until 2:00 AM.

On August 1, 1961, 2-year-old Linnell M. Burns was killed by a dump truck carrying fill to the Kingsbury Run site when he dashed into the street. The following day, more than 500 protestors—most of them mothers—formed a picket line outside the main gate of the convention center construction site at 6:00 PM, preventing trucks from leaving for several hours. After an emergency meeting at city hall that night, city officials and construction company executives agreed to reroute trucks in the Kinsman area so they avoided residential blocks. They also agreed to stop running trucks at midnight, and to add more stop signs in the neighborhood to prevent trucks from speeding.

On August 8, 1961, however, Cleveland police arrested five truck drivers for improperly passing, and two for having loads which spewed earth on city streets. When Hunkin-Conkey officials protested the arrest, Mayor Celebrezze backed the police department. The arrests outraged Kinsman residents, who saw them as evidence that the construction company had violated the terms of the August 3 agreement. A group of 65 Kinsman residents blocked Kinsman Road on August 11, refusing to allow any dump trucks through their neighborhood. The residents also accused the company of continuing to send truck through their neighborhood until 4:00 AM. Truckers complained that the agreement only forced them to stop departing the construction site at 2:00 AM, which meant that they might depart Kingsbury Run at 3:00 AM or 4:00 AM. They refused to begin their work day at 6:00 AM to make up for the lost hours. Forcing them to cut their work day by two hours would require overloading their trucks, leading to more speeding, dangerous driving, and spills.

On August 12, 1961, more than 200 protestors blocked Kinsman Road, and Cleveland police arrested four local residents for rioting. Local residents scoffed at claims of a riot, and blamed law enforcement for a "police riot". After the incident, city officials pledged to find a different location for the fill. The new site chosen for the fill was the future site of Cleveland Burke Lakefront Airport.

== 1962: Finishing the foundation ==
=== Excavation and foundation work ===
The new year began with no work at the convention center construction site. Mayor Celebrezze ordered city Law Director Ralph S. Locher to order Hunkin-Conkey to begin work in three days or be in default of its completion bond. These demands were communication on December 26 and 27, 1961. The construction company replied with a five-page letter outlining why it could not. William S. Hunsel, a consultant to Outcalt, Guenther & Van Buren, advised Hunkin-Conkey to dewater in sections, laying the foundation in sections. But the company refused, as this would be much more expensive. Implementing a new drainage system was the only solution, company officials said, and it would take four more months to finish the foundation. (Note: Hunkin-Conkey also said that Hunsel kept ordering them to do more tests and to conduct field experiments for his research.) Hunkin-Conkey's reply was unacceptable to the city, so on January 11 Cleveland Properties Director Harold Lausche sent the bonding firm, Federal Insurance Co., noticed of failure to perform. Defending itself to the insurer, Hunkin-Conkey said its contract required all pumping to be complete before additional excavation could proceed. The company admitted that it had successfully tested a dragline excavator to remove watery soil at the site, but it would need written city approval to use the excavator for the remaining foundation work.

On January 14, 1962, Outcalt, Guenther & Van Buren ordered Hunkin-Conkey to proceed with the excavation using the dragline excavator. The company was to dig out 90-by-150-foot (27 by 46 m) sections at a time, lay the foundation, and proceed to the next section. Hunkin-Conkey protested that this would be much more expensive, and announced it would seek reimbursement from the city for the added expense. The city said it would go to court to prevent payment. The first section of foundation was ready for pouring on January 15 in the southwest corner of the site. (Note: Bore holes 30 inches (76 cm) in diameter and 6 feet (1.8 m) deep were dug to test if each section was ready concrete. If the holes remained dry, then the foundation was laid. If they filled with water, more pumps were used to dry the section out.)

Half the foundation, including base elements for the supporting columns was poured by March 15 as excavation occurred on the rest of the site. The foundation neared completion on May 25, with the total cost reaching nearly $2.25 million ($23,948,020 in 2025 dollars). (Note: The penalty imposed on Hunkin-Conkey for the delay was $25 per day ($266 per day in 2025 dollars). This worked out to about $4,525 ($48,162 in 2025 dollars).)

=== Superstructure work ===
In May, the city began to prepare for construction of the exhibit hall, roof, and 3.5 story reception pavilion. Costs for this phase of construction were estimated at $7.5 million to $8 million ($79,826,733 to $85,148,515 in 2025 dollars). Officials were shocked, however, when the lowest construction bid (by William Passalacqua Builders, Inc. and Blount Bros.) (Note: Passalacqua Builders was a local firm, while Blount Bros. was from Montgomery, Alabama.) for the projects came in at $10.556 million ($112,353,465 in 2025 dollars), more than $2.8 million ($29,801,980 in 2025 dollars) over the estimate. Other contracts awarded at this time included those for plumbing (to Spohn Heating & Ventilating Co., $483,400 [$5,145,099 in 2025 dollars]), heating and venting (to Reliance Heating & Air Conditioning Inc., $1.203 million [$12,804,208 in 2025 dollars]), and electrical (to Doan Electric Co., $1.82 million [$19,371,287 in 2025 dollars]).

Two means were found to make up the deficit. The federal government agreed to pay the city $611,000 ($6,503,218 in 2025 dollars) for fill dirt from the site. For the rest of the funds, the city council agreed to issue $3.5 million ($37,252,475 in 2025 dollars) in councilmanic bonds. Council member Latkovic introduced the legislation to authorize the bonds on June 11, and the legislation was approved on June 15. (Note: Initially, the amount of the councilmanic bonds was enough to pay for the installation of air conditioning at the convention center, a $600,000 ($6,386,139 in 2025 dollars) cost. The city also declined to cut escalators and moveable partitions in the exhibit hall, both of where were considered key to the convention center's success.) The amount of councilmanic bonds issued rose to $3.9 million ($41,509,901 in 2025 dollars), however, after contractors identified another $400,000 ($4,257,426 in 2025 dollars) in unanticipated costs. The contracts for the $11,708,700 ($124,622,302 in 2025 dollars) exhibit hall, roof, and reception pavilion were let on August 3. By year's end, the council had voted to issue another $380,000 ($3,996,196 in 2025 dollars) in councilmanic bonds to cover unanticipated costs in constructing the pavilion.

The convention center's floor and walls were completed at the end of July. City officials estimated that, despite the numerous delays, construction would still be complete by January 1964. Issues with water continued to plague the site. The city hired the engineering firm of Barber, Magee & Hollman to conduct soil tests to determine why water was proving to be such a problem. The firm discovered that the water table was higher than previously estimated. Pumping would continue to be needed (at a cost of $750 a day [$7,983 in 2025 dollars]) until walls were higher than water table. The company also ordered that additional concrete be laid on floor to act as water barrier.

Hunkin-Conkey filed suit against city in July 1963 over the $832,000 ($8,749,565 in 2025 dollars) in costs the company incurred over water removal. In December 1963, Judge Earl R. Hoover of the Court of Common Pleas ruled that the city owed $306,373 ($3,221,912 in 2025 dollars) to Hunkin-Conkey for extra work incurred in the excavation. The court did not, however, rule yet on whether Hunkin-Conkey must pay $526,000 ($5,598,515 in 2025 dollars) in damages for delaying the excavation.

Work on the exhibit hall, roof, and reception pavilion began August 22. Lakeside Avenue was closed in October to allow construction of the tunnel connecting the convention center to Public Auditorium's Lakeside Hall on north side of the street.

== 1963: Constructing the exhibition hall and reflecting pool ==
=== Construction of the roof ===
The fabrication of the steel for the new convention center and the delivery of materials took most of the fall and late winter of 1962, and the early winter and spring of 1963. Steel began arriving in mid-April. This consisted of nine 80-short-ton (73 t) girders, each 120 feet (37 m) long, for the structure's roof, fabricated by the American Bridge Division of U.S. Steel at its steel works in Ambridge, Pennsylvania. Holding up the roof were massive steel columns, the largest of which were placed where the pool and fountains would be constructed. (The second-largest columns supported the roof of the tunnel beneath Lakeside Avenue.) By the first week of May, the superstructure of the exhibition hall was 36 percent complete, while the steel frame for the reception pavilion almost finished. Pouring of concrete for the tunnels and stairways connecting the reception pavilion to the underground exhibition hall was also almost done. Work was progressing so well, construction officials estimated that the convention center—whose total cost was now estimated at $14 million ($147,228,261 in 2025 dollars)—would be completed in August 1964.

Cost overruns became an issue on the site in 1963. As work on the fountains progressed, rising costs forced the Hanna Trust to shift $200,000 ($2,103,261 in 2025 dollars) from the proposed maintenance endowment and apply it to design and construction costs. In June, the city council discovered that plans for the convention center had failed to include landscaping costs. A request for nearly $372,000 ($3,912,065 in 2025 dollars) was made for brickwork, sidewalks, stonework, and topsoil. The city council was very angry that these costs had been overlooked, (Note: Much of the anger was because the city learned of the cost omission on April 16, but did not tell the council for nearly two months.) but approved the request on July 2 by a vote of 28-to-4. The council was forced to sell land at Cooley Farms (the city's juvenile work farm) to pay for the landscaping.

The roof of the convention center and tunnel beneath Lakeside Avenue began to be laid during the summer. The roof over the Lakeside Avenue tunnel was finished in early July. It consisted of 20 inches (51 cm) of concrete reinforced with 1.125-inch (2.86 cm) thick steel rods. By July 18, fill earth forming the roadbed for the street was in place over the tunnel roof. For the convention center roof, cranes were used to pipe concrete on top of the superstructure. Where the cranes could not reach, a 300-foot (91 m) long, 8-inch (20 cm) wide steel pipe—one of only a few such pipes in the nation—was used. Twin electric pumps pushed concrete through the pipe at 3,000 pounds (1,400 kg) per 1-square-inch (6.5 cm^{2}). The pipe could pour 60 to 65 cubic yards (46 to 50 m^{3}) of concrete per hour. Metal cables running through the still-liquid concrete were vibrated to ensure a flush fit against previously poured concrete and to eliminate voids.

=== Construction of the reflecting pool ===
As the roof was completed, the reflecting pool was constructed on top of it. The landscape architects Clarke and Rapuano designed the 22-inch (56 cm) deep, 80-by-300-foot (24 by 91 m) pool. The pool walls were 4 feet (1.2 m) thick at the base, and tapered as they rose. (Note: Two steps occurred in the pool wall as well, where the roofing felt was laid. The felt overlay these steps, helping to waterproof them.) A sheet of monel (a rustproof nickel alloy metal) was embedded in the wall, rising to within 5 inches (13 cm) of the top of the wall. The entire wall was coated in epoxy as a waterproofer. Nine 118.5-foot (36.1 m) steel girders acted both to support the pool above and the ceiling of the main exhibition hall below. These steel girders were nearly 8 feet (2.4 m) below ground to accommodate the pool's construction. On top of the girders were double-tongued, prestressed, precast concrete T-beams. The tongue of each T-beam was 3 inches (7.6 cm) thick, and the height of the T-beam 19 inches (48 cm). A 2-inch (5.1 cm) thick layer of concrete was laid atop the T-beams, forming the floor of the pool. Five layers of roofing felt were laid atop the concrete floor, followed by a 6-inch (15 cm) layer of perlite. A grid of concrete beams, each 6 by 13 inches (15 by 33 cm) and over 30 feet (9.1 m) long, was laid in the perlite to support the layers above. Inverted U-shaped drainage tiles were inserted between the beams to help remove any water which leaked from above. A 0.006-inch (0.15 mm) thick sheet of polyethylene formed a moisture barrier above the perlite, and 6-inch (15 cm) thick layer of concrete laid atop the moisture barrier. The bottom of the pool consisted of another five layers of roofing felt, on top of which were laid a 1.5-inch (3.8 cm) thick layer of gravel. The gravel-impregnated grout was laid down in alternating grey and white sections (each section separated by a brass rail), to add visual distinctiveness to the bottom of the pool. The granite for the lip of the pool was imported from West Germany. The granite, which was shaped to wrap around the exterior, top, and interior of the lip, was about 2 inches (5.1 cm) thick. The lip of the pool was made of concrete. It was 3 feet (0.91 m) wide, and dropped in a pitch of 8 inches (20 cm) was it extended toward the water. Overflow drains were placed at intervals on the inside of the lip, just below the granite cladding. A gutter just outside the pool provided extra diversion in case water spilled over the lip. Grey granite slabs, also imported from West Germany, formed a sidewalk around the pool.

=== Civil rights dispute and completion of the superstructure ===
A major civil rights dispute broke out at the convention center construction site on June 24. The United Freedom Movement, a coalition of African American civic and cultural groups, accused four labor unions working at the site of barring blacks from membership. The dispute threatened several important bond levys and federal aid flowing to construction projects in Cleveland, and imperiled construction on the convention center as well as other large projects in the area. An agreement signed by federal government representatives, local labor leaders, representatives from the African American community, and others brought the dispute to a close. The agreement was hailed by government officials and the NAACP as nationally important.

Construction on the convention center was 60 percent complete by mid-August 1964. Construction had gone so well during the summer that officials with the Blount and Passalacqua companies said they would be able to complete the facility's roof by the August 31 deadline. This would enable landscaping to begin in October.

By early October, final construction on the exhibit hall was ahead of schedule. City officials estimated that the convention center would now be ready in time for the American Mining Congress trade show in May 1964. A formal opening would occur in August. A slight problem in construction occurred when 30 unionized carpenters walked off the job on October 8 in a jurisdictional strike with the Laborers' Union over unloading of material. This delayed construction of a ramp for two days.

By late October 1963, the pool was all but complete. Work on the granite cladding and sidewalk was suspended for the winter, with about half the work finished. (Note: The pool's 1963 design was much different from an original 1962 design, which featured an 8 inches (20 cm) thick concrete floor, supported only by a 5-inch (13 cm) thick layer of pitch, a 4-to-5-inch (10 to 13 cm) thick bed of sand, a layer of hot-mix asphalt, and a layer of cut-back asphalt concrete.)

== 1964: Completion of the convention center ==
=== Finishing work ===
By January 1964, construction officials announced that the convention center would not be ready in time for its initial April 1 opening. This forced the United Auto Workers to move their convention to Atlantic City, New Jersey. Costs on the convention center kept rising as well. On February 14, the city council voted to issue another $1 million ($10,380,901 in 2025 dollars) in new councilmanic bonds to finish the structure. This money included $285,000 ($2,958,557 in 2025 dollars) to repay the federal study loan, $200,000 ($2,076,180 in 2025 dollars) for unforeseen expenses, and an unspecified sum to cover furnishings and equipment (which had been mistaken left out of the construction budget). The council was undecided on whether to issue another $500,000 ($5,190,451 in 2025 dollars) in bonds or find some other revenue to cover the cost of rebuilding Lakeside Avenue, another item which had never been budgeted for.

As the convention center neared completion in March 1964, various private-sector meeting planners, businessmen, and city officials began pressing the city to authorize a liquor license for the convention center. A number of newly opened convention centers across the country had a cocktail lounge, which were in high demand by convention-goers and generated significant income. One Cleveland area businessman said that the cocktail lounge at Cobo Hall, a new convention center in Detroit, brought in $100,000 ($1,038,090 in 2025 dollars) a year. Mayor Locher promised to investigate the issue.

The rebuilding of Lakeside Avenue began on May 1 and was scheduled for completion on October 1. Pioneer Contracting won the contract to lay sewer lines beneath the street and to pave it.

On April 1, contractors said they would be finished with the "Great Hall" of the convention center on May 1, in time for the American Mining Congress meeting to open on May 11. Work on the reception pavilion, meeting rooms, and other areas of the convention center were scheduled for completion on about July 1. Landscaping was two months ahead of schedule, although only a few trees had been planted thus far, and work on it was scheduled for completion on October 1. The fountains, the centerpiece of the new mall, neared completion on May 1. By this time, the "Great Hall" was 98 percent complete, with only the installation of handrails and stone steps in the lobby and some final cleaning remaining to be done. Despite the many delays created by excavation issues and labor disputes, construction was still three months ahead of schedule.

=== May 1964 informal opening ===
The Cleveland Convention Center opened on May 11, 1964, three months ahead of schedule. Ohio Governor Jim Rhodes and Mayor Locher were joined at the ribbon-cutting by Herbert C. Jackson, Executive Vice President of Pickands Mather and president of American Mining Congress. The 1964 American Mining Congress Coal Show was the first event ever held in the new convention center. (The only complaint: The loading docks were not yet ready.)

To celebrate the completion of the Cleveland Convention Center in August 1964, a gala celebration was held. Mayor Locher began planning for this event in November 1962. F. Pat O'Toole, president of the local advertising and public relations firm O'Toole, Mills & Associates, chaired the organizing committee for what became known as the Parade of Progress.

=== August 1964 formal dedication ===
The 11-day long Parade of Progress opened on August 28, 1964. More than 5,000 attended the opening ceremony and listened to speeches by former mayor Celebrezze; Mayor Locher; Curtis Lee Smith, president of the Cleveland Chamber of Commerce; Thomas Vail, publisher and editor of The Plain Dealer, and Francis Andrew Coy, president of May Company Ohio and the Parade of Progress. At 11:30 A.M., President Lyndon B. Johnson spoke to the crowd via a telephone hook-up. At 11:34 A.M., as his remarks concluded, President Johnson sent a signal via satellite which turned on the new fountains on the mall and which formally signaled the opening of the convention center. (Note: President Johnson spoke with Mayor Locher by phone prior to his speech, congratulating him on the construction of the facility.)

The Parade of Progress was a major success, and notable event in its own right. A total of 330 business, civic, religious, cultural, and other groups were exhibitors in the Great Hall. Taking up the most space in the hall was the NASA Lewis Research Center. Each night, there was live televised and radio entertainment featuring, among others, the Cleveland Women's Orchestra; singers Skeeter Davis, Ethel Ennis, Ketty Lester, and Mike Douglas; singing group Norm Knuth and His Starlighters; and local television personalities Ron Penfound (host of the Captain Penny children's show), Paige Palmer (fitness show host), and Paul Wilcox (sportscaster and host of Polka Varieties). A total of 540,204 people attended the Parade of Progress, far outstripping the 200,000 attendees estimated to attend before it opened. (Note: The biggest one-day attendance was 81,580 on the final day.)

The Cleveland Convention Center was profiled in Business Week magazine after the opening. Cleveland civic leaders argued that, despite the cost overruns, the Cleveland Convention Center compared favorably to those in other cities. Cobo Hall in Detroit had cost $55 million ($598,565,804 in 2025 dollars), but had just 380,000 square feet (35,000 m^{2}) of space. McCormick Place in Chicago cost $38 million ($413,554,556 in 2025 dollars) and had even less space. City leaders estimated that the Cleveland Convention Center would bring in $24 to $36 million a year ($249,141,631 to $373,712,446 in 2025 dollars) in convention business.

Two things marred the opening of the convention center. First, sidewalks on the mall had not been completed by the time the Parade of Progress opened in late August. Second, the reflecting pool leaked. Two sources of leaks were determined. One was that the grout at the pool bottom had cracked, forcing the pool to be drained and caulked in places. The second cause of leaks was inoperative filters. The public had thrown trash into the pool during the Parade of Progress, clogging and damaging some filters. Gravel from the pool bottom had also come loose, and damaged the pumps. Several pumps and all the filters had to be replaced.

== 1980s renovation ==
=== Raising new taxes and obtaining a loan ===
By 1982, the Cleveland Convention Center was losing money. The exterior had undergone a little sprucing up (with the addition of two electronic signs, which cost a total of $300,000 [$1,000,862 in 2025 dollars]), but the facility was in increasing disrepair and its appearance reflected 1960s interior design aesthetics. Although Clarke and Rapuano had designed the reflecting pool to last 100 years, after just 16 years the pool leaked noticeably into the Great Hall below. Fixing it required expensive repairs to the expansion joints in the roof and recaulking much of the pool. The electrical system was inadequate and outdated, the heating controls were failing, and the air conditioning system was nearing the end of its lifetime. The columns and walls in the Great Hall as well as the ramp from the upper level had been damaged by exhibitors, and extensive wear and tear had left the restrooms and carpeting throughout the facility worn. Exhibitors also complained about a lack of meeting room space. In the Music Hall section of Public Auditorium, the restrooms needed to be made accessible, and worn carpeting, drapes, and concessions equipment needed to be replaced. The total cost of repairs was estimated at $6 million ($20,017,241 in 2025 dollars). Lack of business meant that the center lost about $1 million ($1,000,862 in 2025 dollars) a year in the late 1970s. By 1982, this loss had risen to $1.9 million ($6,338,793 in 2025 dollars), and the convention center estimated that it would run a $1.7 million ($5,495,322 in 2025 dollars) deficit in 1983.

In August 1982, the Cleveland Convention Center and Visitors Bureau urged the city to reinstate a hotel/motel "bed tax". The city tax had been repealed two years ago in favor of a county-wide bed tax. This 3 percent tax funneled 2 percent (or about $1.5 million [$1,000,862 in 2025 dollars] a year) to the CCVB, while sending the rest of the money to cities and towns which had hotels and motels. The CCVB claimed that the tax revenues would be used to pay for $12 million ($40,034,483 in 2025 dollars) in repairs and upgrades to the Convention Center and Public Auditorium. Cleveland Mayor George Voinovich and Cleveland City Council President George L. Forbes both endorsed the proposal.

At the end of December 1982, the state of Ohio loaned the city of Cleveland $3.5 million ($11,676,724 in 2025 dollars) for convention center repairs, to be repaid over 20 years at 6 percent interest. (Note: The loan was received by the CCVB on March 22, 1984.) The loan was contingent on the city making its own contribution of $2.5 million ($8,340,517 in 2025 dollars) to the project. To repay the loan, the city council actively began considering legislation to reinstate its 3 percent bed tax as well as adding a 1 percent food and beverage tax. To meet the required budget for repairs, the CCVB also asked the city council to authorize $2.5 million in councilmanic bonds. Legislation authorizing a 3 percent bed tax was introduced in the Cleveland City Council on January 24, 1983, by Council member Michael Polensek. Mayor Voinovich and the CCVB both endorsed the bed tax, which was estimated to raise $900,000 ($2,909,288 in 2025 dollars) annually. The legislation won final approval on June 15, 1983.

Issuing councilmanic bonds was considered highly risky. Mayor Ralph Perk (in office from 1972 to 1977) had borrowed $52 million ($276,276,771 in 2025 dollars) in bond funds, raised to pay for capital improvement projects, to fund the city's operating expenses. Perk also increased the city's short-term debt from $22 million ($174,897,288 in 2025 dollars) to $88 million ($467,545,305 in 2025 dollars), and granted $35 million ($185,955,519 in 2025 dollars) in property tax abates for two costly downtown redevelopment projects. Credit downgrades forced the city to turn to local banks for loans, and Cleveland defaulted on $15.5 million ($76,511,480 in 2025 dollars) in bank loans on December 16, 1978. Issuing councilmanic bonds for the convention center renovation would mark Cleveland's first return to the bond markets since the default.

The city council passed legislation approving $2.6 million ($8,404,611 in 2025 dollars) in councilmanic bonds (Note: Another source claims it was $2.5 million ($8,081,356 in 2025 dollars).) on June 15, 1983. Two-thirds of the revenue from the bed tax was dedicated to paying off the state loan. To help win passage of the bed tax and bond sale, the CCVB agreed to divert $300,000 ($969,763 in 2025 dollars) a year in county revenues to help pay for the renovations. The bonds successfully sold out on June 20, 1983.

=== First phase of the renovation ===
The CCVB began what it called "phase one" of the convention center's renovation in June 1983. This phase, which cost $6 million ($19,395,256 in 2025 dollars), made critical repairs to the Great Hall's columns, ramp, and walls; fixed the leaking reflecting pool; made major upgrades to the electrical, heating, and air conditioning systems; replaced carpeting throughout the facility; and refurbished the restrooms. It also made some upgrades and repairs in the Music Hall section of Public Auditorium. The CCVB had also worked up a wish-list of other repair and refurbishment goals it wanted to accomplish, including expanding the Great Hall at the convention center. It also wanted to replace broken floor and wainscot marble, improve the electrical system, repaint many areas, and add a new sound system in the Music Hall. It broke these down into a second and third phase, pegged the cost of these items at $7 million ($22,627,798 in 2025 dollars), and began lobbying the city for these funds as well.

The architectural joint venture of Dalton, Dalton, Newport (Note: During the project, Dalton, Dalton, Newport was bought out by URS Corporation, and changed its name to URS Dalton.) and Polytech Inc. was given a contract for $700,000 ($2,262,780 in 2025 dollars) to prepare architectural and engineering plans for the phase one renovations. The plans called for 18 to 24 months of work on waterproofing the pool; repairing mall sidewalks; repairing and upgrading the air conditioning, electrical, and ventilation systems; replacing the heating system; adding moveable partitions to the Great Hall; replacing the doors on the loading dock; and renovating the reception pavilion. Actual work began in February 1984.

=== Quadrupling the size of the renovation ===
By March 1984, the CCVB was asking for an additional $13 million ($40,286,675 in 2025 dollars) over five years to make additional repairs and upgrades. These included transforming the exhibit hall beneath Public Auditorium into office and meeting room space, a new sound system in the Music Hall, replacing broken marble flooring and wainscoting in Public Auditorium, and adding new meeting room space to the convention center. Another $6 million ($18,593,850 in 2025 dollars) was sought for a new communications center (to include a small film studio and television satellite uplink room), banquet kitchen, and covered walkways at the convention center, and for facility-wide painting and replacement of carpeting and upholstery at Public Auditorium. Work on the convention center halted as the CCVB lobbied the city to pay for the projects, whose cost had risen to a total of $27 million ($83,672,325 in 2025 dollars) (including the already-funded repairs) by October 1984.

In the summer of 1984, the CCVB hired the Cleveland-based investment firm Prescott Ball & Turben to study ways to finance the expanded renovation. The study made a number of recommendations, none of which were adopted. Independently, the CCVB concluded that it should stop spending $1 million ($3,098,975 in 2025 dollars) a year on convention center promotions and use the savings to make the convention center repairs. After six weeks of discussion the CCVB board of directors approved a plan to divert $1.2 million ($3,718,770 in 2025 dollars) a year (or 90 percent of its income) for 30 years to pay for bonds for renovating the convention center. It asked the city to issue the $19 million ($58,880,525 in 2025 dollars) it required.

After additional cost estimates were made, the city ended up issuing $22 million ($65,857,054 in 2025 dollars) in new variable-rate, 20-year bonds to finance the convention center repairs. $15 million ($44,902,537 in 2025 dollars) in bonds were issued on June 26, 1985, with another $7 million ($20,954,517 in 2025 dollars) issued on December 6, 1985. Variable-rate bonds were chosen in order to save $15 to $20 million ($44,902,537 to $59,870,050 in 2025 dollars) in interest costs. The city agreed to pay 36 percent of the cost of the bonds, allowing the bonds to mature in 20 rather than 30 years.

=== Second, third, fourth, and fifth phase renovations ===
The $6 million ($17,622,951 in 2025 dollars) "Phase One" project began again in March 1986 and was expected to take a year. R.P. Carbone Construction Co., Heery Program Management Inc., and ColeJon Mechanical Corp. supervised the construction during phase one, which now included finishing repairs on the Great Hall; replacement of the heating system; repairs and upgrades to the air conditioning, electrical, and ventilation systems; repairs to the leaking reflecting pool; and repairs to the foundations and exterior walls.

"Phase two" of the project involved renovation of the convention center's Great Hall, Public Auditorium, and the reception pavilion. Aveni Construction Co. was the contractor for work in the convention center and reception pavilion, which involved conversion of some space to expand the 15 meeting rooms (Note: The Plain Dealer had earlier reported that there were 14 meeting rooms.) in the convention center and Public Auditorium from an average size of 1,000 square feet (93 m^{2}) to 2,000 square feet (190 m^{2}). These rooms, which were also completely renovated, now could seat anywhere from 100 to 650 people. Further upgrades and repairs were made to the heating system controls and the air conditioning, electrical, and ventilation systems. A moveable partition was added to the Great Hall, allowing it to be divided. New lighting and more than 800 telephone lines were added as well, and exhibitor offices were built on a new mezzanine overlooking the exhibition space. Turner Construction was contractor for the Public Auditorium work. The old exhibition space below Public Auditorium was converted into a lobby, cocktail lounge, office space, piano bar, and 15 new meeting rooms. (Note: The Plain Dealer had earlier reported that there were 19 new meeting rooms.) The bathrooms in Public Auditorium were renovated to make them accessible as well as modern, and all public spaces in Public Auditorium were retiled, repainted, and replastered, while furniture received new upholstery. New taxicab stands were built at each end of Public Auditorium, and small gardens placed at each end of each taxi stand. The exterior metal sheathing on the reception pavilion was removed and replaced with stone, and new paving and exterior lighting installed. New mechanical window blinds were installed to help cool the pavilion as well as to block bright sunlight. Indoor trees were planted in the pavilion to add visual warmth, and the facility received a new terrazzo floor, new stone wainscoting, and new fabric wall coverings. To make registration more efficient, a new, central curved registration desk was built. A closed-circuit television system was added throughout the convention center, with monitors placed at the central registration desk. Displays about Cleveland area attractions and dining facilities were erected in the reception pavilion, and various airlines serving the local airport were allowed to have kiosks so that convention-goers could make flight reservations more easily. The total cost of Phase Two was $6 million ($17,622,951 in 2025 dollars). (Note: $1.5 million ($4,405,738 in 2025 dollars) was spent on the heating and electrical systems and new Great Hall partition, and $1.8 million ($5,286,885 in 2025 dollars) on the reception pavilion renovations. The remaining funds were spent on all other aspects of Phase Two.) The Public Auditorium renovations were complete by the end of July 1986, while the Great Hall work was just beginning.

"Phase Three" of the project involved work on the mall and exterior facade renovations. Cleveland City Architect Paul Volpe designed new streetlight lampposts for E. 6th Street based on 1922 designs. He also designed low-level bollard lighting for the mall, and new gold floodlights to illuminate the four sides of Public Auditorium. Landscapers preserved the 16-year-old symmetrical lines of trees on the mall, but added new triangular areas of seating on either side of the fountains. Work on the fountains, which frequently broke down, was also done.

"Phase Four" of the project included two major changes. First, the old Public Auditorium exhibition hall north of Lakeside Avenue was converted into a new 4,000-seat ballroom. (Note: The Plain Dealer later reported that it was a 3,200-seat ballroom, but then returned to the original estimate.) The north wall of the new ballroom, which overlooked the railroad tracks, was removed, and replaced with a glass curtain wall to give convention-goers an exterior view. This part of the project cost $7 million ($19,837,434 in 2025 dollars), and was due for completion in the fall of 1987. (Note: The kitchen attached to the ballroom cost $1 million ($2,833,919 in 2025 dollars) alone.) These changes meant the convention center now had 375,000 square feet (34,800 m^{2}) of total space, with 205,000 square feet (19,000 m^{2}) of contiguous space which could be subdivided. (Note: The combined convention center/Public Auditorium exhibition space declined from 429,000 square feet (39,900 m^{2}) to 375,000 square feet (34,800 m^{2}), with lost space going to the new meeting rooms. This still left Cleveland's convention center almost as large as the new 1983 Washington Convention Center in Washington, D.C. (381,000 square feet (35,400 m^{2})), and the 1931 Philadelphia Convention Hall and Civic Center in Philadelphia. Pennsylvania (382,000 square feet (35,500 m^{2})).)

"Phase Five" of the project involved making numerous miscellaneous, aesthetic improvements to the interior of the convention center and Public Auditorium, as well as some asbestos abatement.

In 1986, as the renovations neared completion, a problem was identified with the convention center. The architects became worried about the roof beneath Mall C, which was designed to hold 50 pounds per square foot (240 kg/m^{2}). The architects realized that because of various festivals (which often featured heavy food trucks and other vehicles) held in the area, the roof needed to support 100 pounds per square foot (490 kg/m^{2}). Mall C was closed to all traffic except pedestrians in late February 1987, and reopened after additional structural analysis in June. Mall C was closed permanently to all vehicles again in September 1987.

The renovated Cleveland Convention Center reopened on October 5, 1987. It had 22 meeting rooms, ranging from 100 to 1,000 seats in capacity. It had a total of 375,000 square feet (34,800 m^{2}) of space, of which 205,000 square feet (19,000 m^{2}) could be broken down using moveable partitions into five halls—each with 200 10-square-foot (0.93 m^{2}) exhibit spaces. The mezzanine had been converted from bar and private function space to offices for exhibitors. Incomplete at the time (but on schedule for finishing by the end of the year) was the new 4,000-seat ballroom and attached catering kitchen. The total cost of the renovations was $28 million ($79,349,736 in 2025 dollars). (Note: Originally, the renovations were to have included tunnels to the nearby 526-room Bond Court Hotel (opened in 1976) and 510-room Hollenden House (opened in 1965) hotel. But when rising costs forced caused a $3 million shortfall in funding, the two tunnels were canceled. The city and the owner of the hotels engaged in extensive negotiations, but no tunnels were ever built.)

== About the convention center ==
Together, the new convention center was formally given the title "Cleveland Convention Center" in 1964.

=== As originally constructed ===
The Cleveland Convention Center was designed by architect R. Franklin Outcalt of the Cleveland firm of Outcalt, Guenther & Van Buren. Its total cost was $16 million ($166,094,421 in 2025 dollars). The foundation of the convention center was from 40 to 53 feet (12 to 16 m) belowground. The 2.5 to 4.5 feet (0.76 to 1.37 m) thick foundation slab was supported by an unknown number of pilings sunk 50 to 60 feet (15 to 18 m) into the earth. A retaining wall 12 feet (3.7 m) high reinforced the walls, and acted as a barrier against the local water table. The convention center's roof consisted of nine 80-short-ton (73 t) girders, each 120 feet (37 m) long, supported by massive steel columns. To support the weight of the reflecting pool, additional supports were added to the roof. These consisted of nine 118.5-foot (36.1 m) steel girders, on top which were double-tongued, prestressed, precast concrete T-beams. A layer of concrete atop the T-beams formed the roof.

The main exhibition hall (or "Great Hall") had 208,000 square feet (19,300 m^{2}) of exhibition space, and was 32 feet (9.8 m) high. Eighteen meeting rooms surrounded it on the south and west sides. (Note: Originally, the convention center would have had only 226,000 square feet (21,000 m^{2}) of space and only nine meeting rooms. The number of meeting rooms was doubled, which reduced the exhibition footage.) The main decorating scheme of the convention center featured colors of neutral brown and grey, with contrasts in pastel. The walls were covered in travertine, with wood and natural stone used in some places. Escalators connected the convention center to the reception pavilion and Public Auditorium. A tunnel led from the north end of the Great Hall under Lakeside Avenue to Lakeside Exhibition Hall. The convention center was completely air-conditioned. Combined with Public Auditorium, the entire complex had a total of 26 meeting rooms (which could accommodate from 50 to 10,000 people) and either 424,230 square feet (39,412 m^{2}) or 460,771 square feet (42,807.0 m^{2}) of space.

The reception pavilion was described as either 3.5 story or four stories tall. Modernist in style, the rectangular structure featured an exterior of dark-coated aluminum and light grey granite. The long side of the structure was a glass curtain wall. Window louvers automatically opened and closed with sun. The reception pavilion's interior decorating scheme featured colors of bronze and tan. A multi-landing stone staircase with bronze handrails provided access to the convention center's Great Hall.

According to The Plain Dealer, the Cleveland Convention Center was the largest municipally owned convention center in the world, and the Great Hall was the largest single exhibition space in the nation.

Mall B was landscaped with a reflecting pool and fountains after the convention center was completed. This space, designed by landscape architects Gilmore David Clarke and Michael Rapuano, featured a 22-inch (56 cm) deep, 80-by-300-foot (24 by 91 m) reflecting pool. The bottom of the pool featured gravel-impregnated grout laid down in alternating grey and white sections, each section separated by a thin brass rail. A pitched lip of German granite, 3 feet (0.91 m) wide, surrounded the pool. Grey slabs of German granite formed a sidewalk around the pool. The pool was surrounded by 10 fountains. The fountains were heated so they could operate throughout the winter, and illuminated with colored lights. Parallel lines of trees, lit from below, were planted on the mall on either side of the pool and fountains.

A 500-space parking garage was built below Mall B south of the convention center.

=== As renovated ===
Renovations to the Cleveland Convention Center and Public Auditorium were designed by the firms of Dalton, Dalton, Newport and Polytech, Inc. William Ragaller was the lead architect for Dalton, Dalton, Newport. He worked closed with Cleveland City Architect Paul Volpe and CCVB president Jim Glending to design the renovations. The total cost of the renovations was $28 million ($79,349,736 in 2025 dollars).

The reception pavilion received a complete overhaul. Its exterior metal façade of bronzed aluminum was removed and replaced with beige limestone. The glass curtain wall received new mechanical louvers. The interior wall coverings of dark wood paneling and bronzed aluminum were replaced with a cream-colored travertine wainscoting topped by a band of polished stone. Fabric covered the walls above the band, and white wooden grills were used to help break up the space. A new terrazzo floor in pastel colors was also installed. The old reception desk was removed, and a new, curvilinear reception desk was emplaced. Displays about where to eat, drink, and shop in downtown Cleveland were added to the lobby, as were several kiosks where airlines could assist convention-goers in making plane reservations. Six 20-foot (6.1 m) trees were planted inside the lobby to make it more inviting, and new paving and exterior lighting were installed outside the pavilion.

The convention center also received a complete renovation. A 700-foot (210 m) long corridor was created on the east side of the facility to connect the Great Hall with the meeting rooms. At the center of the corridor were the escalators and stairs which connected with the reception pavilion above. At the south end of the corridor, a new carpeted pre-function space was created to support the meeting rooms. The corridor was decorated with horizontal bands of stone in beige, grey, and soft rose; reddish light sconces; and wood grills that mimic the X-like pattern found on the exterior of other buildings on the Cleveland Mall. The corridor floor was now terrazzo, and contained repetitive images of the CCVB logo.

Renovations also included new and refurbished meeting rooms. Existing meeting rooms received new lighting and sound systems, new flooring, and repainted walls. The number of meeting rooms was expanded from 18 to 22, and 15 new meeting rooms were created by converting the exhibition space below Public Auditorium. The meeting rooms (with one exception) now ranged in size from 100-seat capacity to 650-seat capacity. The largest of the meeting rooms was Room 235, which could seat 1,000 or be divided into four rooms of 200 seats each. New moveable partitions were added to the Great Hall of the convention center, allowing it to be converted into up to five halls. The cocktail lounge and private bars on the mezzanine were converted into officers of exhibit managers.

Lakeside Hall was converted into a new ballroom which could seat 4,000 people. Service space between the Great Hall and Lakeside Hall was converted into a new lobby, with staircase access to the surface above. The contemporarily styled lobby had an illuminated ceiling the mimicked a skylight. The steel columns in the space were plastered, and one bare concrete wall covered with a new decoration of sculpted glass block and stone. A corner kiosk in the lobby doubled as a registration desk and a bar. A new monumental staircase, echoing the look of the staircase in Public Auditorium, was built to connect the lobby with the new banquet hall. Rather than the traditional plush look, the ballroom space was designed with an industrial feel that helped unite it visually with the Great Hall. Industrial ceiling lights, covered in Teflon fabric and perforated metal wall sconces helped to light the space. The walls remained raw concrete. To help eliminate the underground feel of the space, the north wall with its three-door railroad loading dock was removed, and a new glass curtain wall installed. To improve the view of Lake Erie beyond, a retaining wall outside the facility was lowered. Service space in Lakeside Hall was converted into a large catering kitchen to serve the ballroom.

The renovated facility was very large. CCVB officials claimed the ballroom was the biggest between New York City and Chicago. The combined convention center/auditorium complex and a total space of 385,000 square feet (35,800 m^{2}).

A number of changes were made to the landscape around Public Auditorium and on the Mall. New signage with contemporary graphics were installed throughout the area. The pedestrian bridge over E. Mall Drive, which connected the upper level of the reception pavilion to Mall B, was reconfigured into a small plaza with flagpoles. Over the entrance to the pavilion hung a 40-foot (12 m) sculpture. Consisting of a number of metal flags, it spun in the wind. Around Public Auditorium, new streetlight lampposts, based on a 1922 design, were manufactured and installed. The terraces on the north and south ends of Public Auditorium were also refurbished. Both received new stone paving and new wooden benches for seating, and the plain aluminum railings were painted to look like copper. The terraces were made more friendly by also adding a number of small trees in planters. A new Postmodern-style arch was constructed to mark the entrance to the north terrace.

== Demolition ==
The Hanna Fountains never worked properly, and the reflecting pool continued to leak into the convention center. The fountains were shut down and the pool drained in 1987. In 1995, the city removed both in a $1.03 million ($2,114,418 in 2025 dollars) refurbishment of Mall B. (The Leonard C. Hanna Foundation contributed $250,000 [$513,208 in 2025 dollars] toward the renovation.)

By 1996, the Cleveland Convention Center was again losing business to other cities. Potential users felt it was too dimly lit, the ceilings were too low, there were not enough meeting rooms, and the facility felt old. In September of that year, the CCVB issued a report calling for a new convention center, one nearly 60 percent larger and with five times as much meeting room space. This plan set in motion 13 years of discussion, planning, and voter initiatives to build a new convention center. These efforts proved fruitful in 2009, when Cuyahoga County signed an agreement with the city on May 4 to purchase the existing convention center for $20 million. The deal called for cutting Public Auditorium off from the convention center, so it would stand on its own again.

Plans for the new convention center were approved by city planning officials in October 2010, and demolition of the old convention center began on January 13, 2011.

The new convention center, now known as the Huntington Convention Center of Cleveland, opened on June 7, 2013.

== Bibliography ==
- Glasberg, Davia Silfen (1989). The Power of Collective Purse Strings: The Effects of Bank Hegemony on Corporations and the State. Berkeley, Calif.: University of California Press. ISBN 9780520064898.
- Zeckendorf, William (1970). The Autobiography of William Zeckendorf. with Edward A. McCreary. New York: Holt, Rinehart and Winston.
