= Huntington Convention Center of Cleveland =

Convention center in Cleveland, Ohio, US

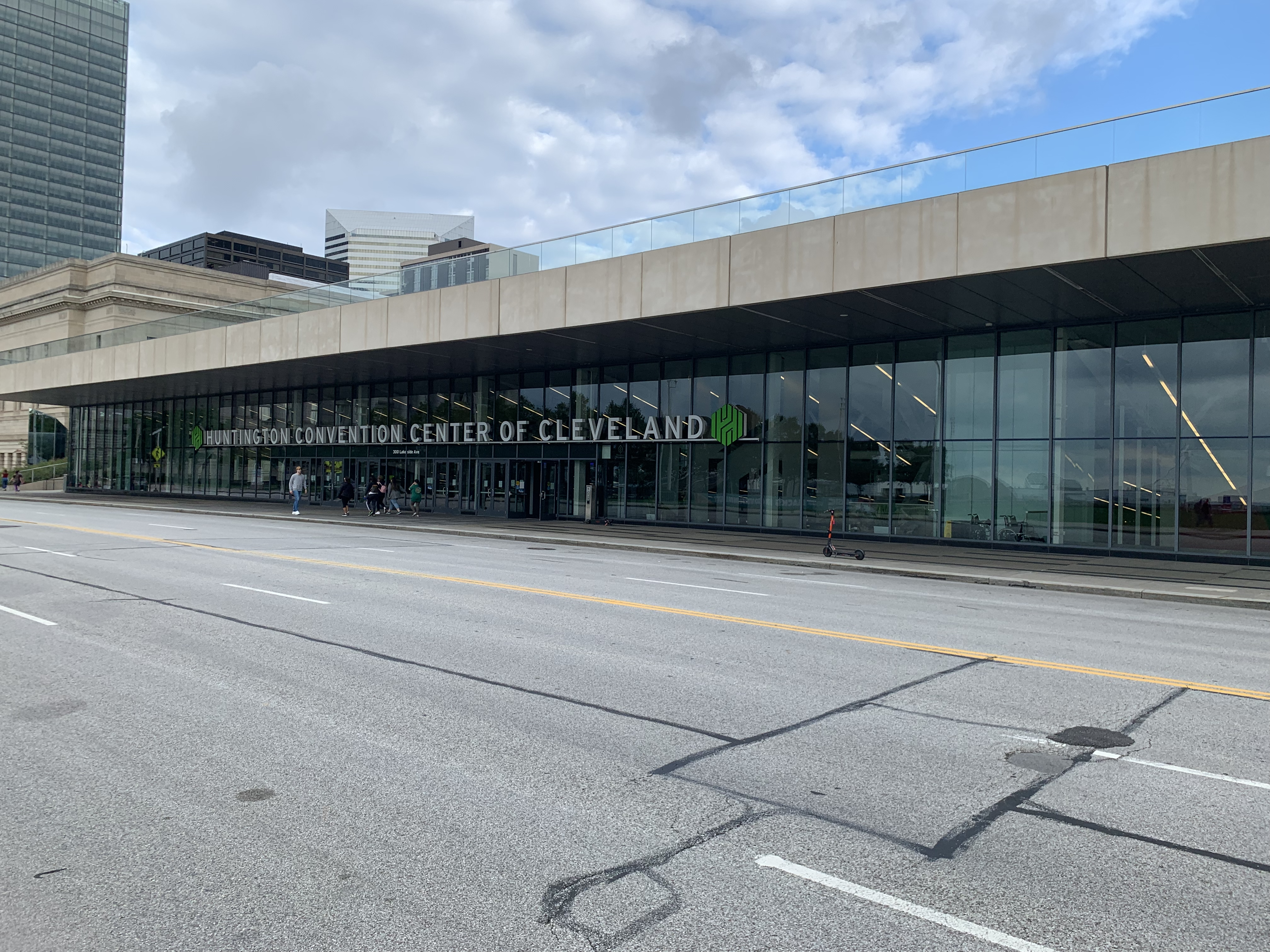
- Huntington Convention Center main entrance in 2022
- Interactive map of Huntington Convention Center of Cleveland
- Former names: Cleveland Convention Center (2013–2015); FirstMerit Convention Center of Cleveland (2015–2016)
- Address: 300 Lakeside Avenue
- Location: Cleveland, Ohio, U.S.
- Coordinates: 41°30′13.5″N 81°41′41.1″W
- Owner: Cuyahoga County
- Operator: ASM Global
- Public transit: Tower City

Construction
- Opened: 2013
- Construction cost: US$465 million

Website
- www.clevelandconventions.com

The Huntington Convention Center of Cleveland is a convention center located in downtown Cleveland, Ohio, in the United States. Built by Cuyahoga County, Ohio, beneath the Cleveland Mall, it opened on June 7, 2013. The older Cleveland Convention Center, built in 1964, was demolished to make way for the new structure.

== About the convention center ==
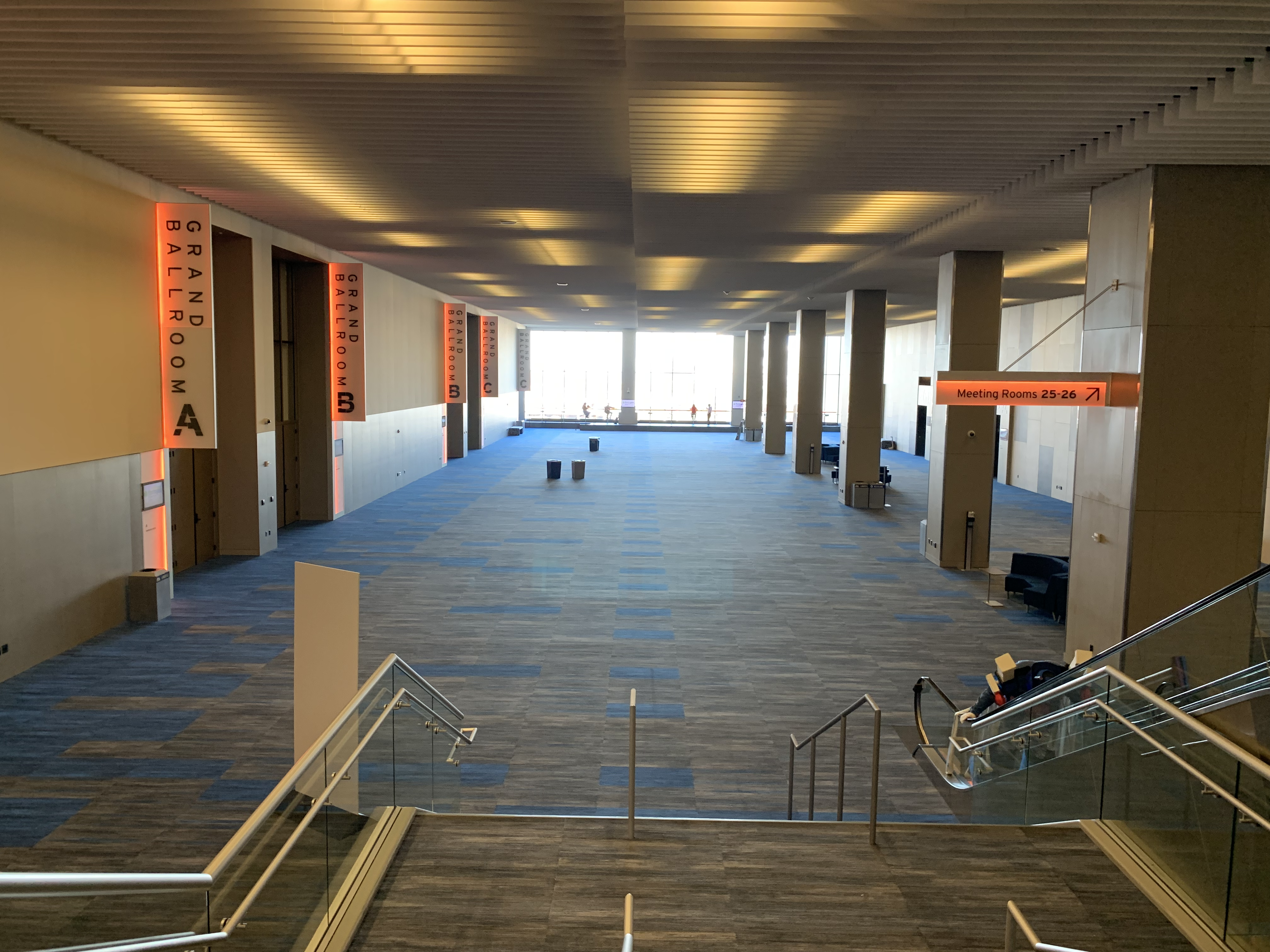
Ballroom reception in 2023

By 1996, the Cleveland Convention Center was losing business to other cities. Potential users felt it was too dimly lit, the ceilings were too low, there were not enough meeting rooms, and the facility felt old. In September of that year, the Cleveland Convention and Visitors' Bureau (CCVB) issued a report calling for a new convention center, one nearly 60 percent larger and with five times as much meeting room space. This plan set in motion 13 years of discussion, planning, and voter initiatives to build a new convention center. These efforts proved fruitful in 2009, when Cuyahoga County signed an agreement with the city of Cleveland on May 4 to purchase the existing convention center for $20 million. The deal called for cutting Public Auditorium off from the convention center, so it would stand on its own again.

Plans for the new convention center were approved by city planning officials in October 2010, and demolition of the old convention center began on January 13, 2011.

The new convention center opened on June 7, 2013.

The naming rights to the facility were purchased by FirstMerit Bank in September 2015, and later assumed by Huntington Bank in April 2016 following their merger with FirstMerit.
