= Public Auditorium =

Multi-purpose venue in Cleveland, Ohio, US

- Public Hall · Music Hall
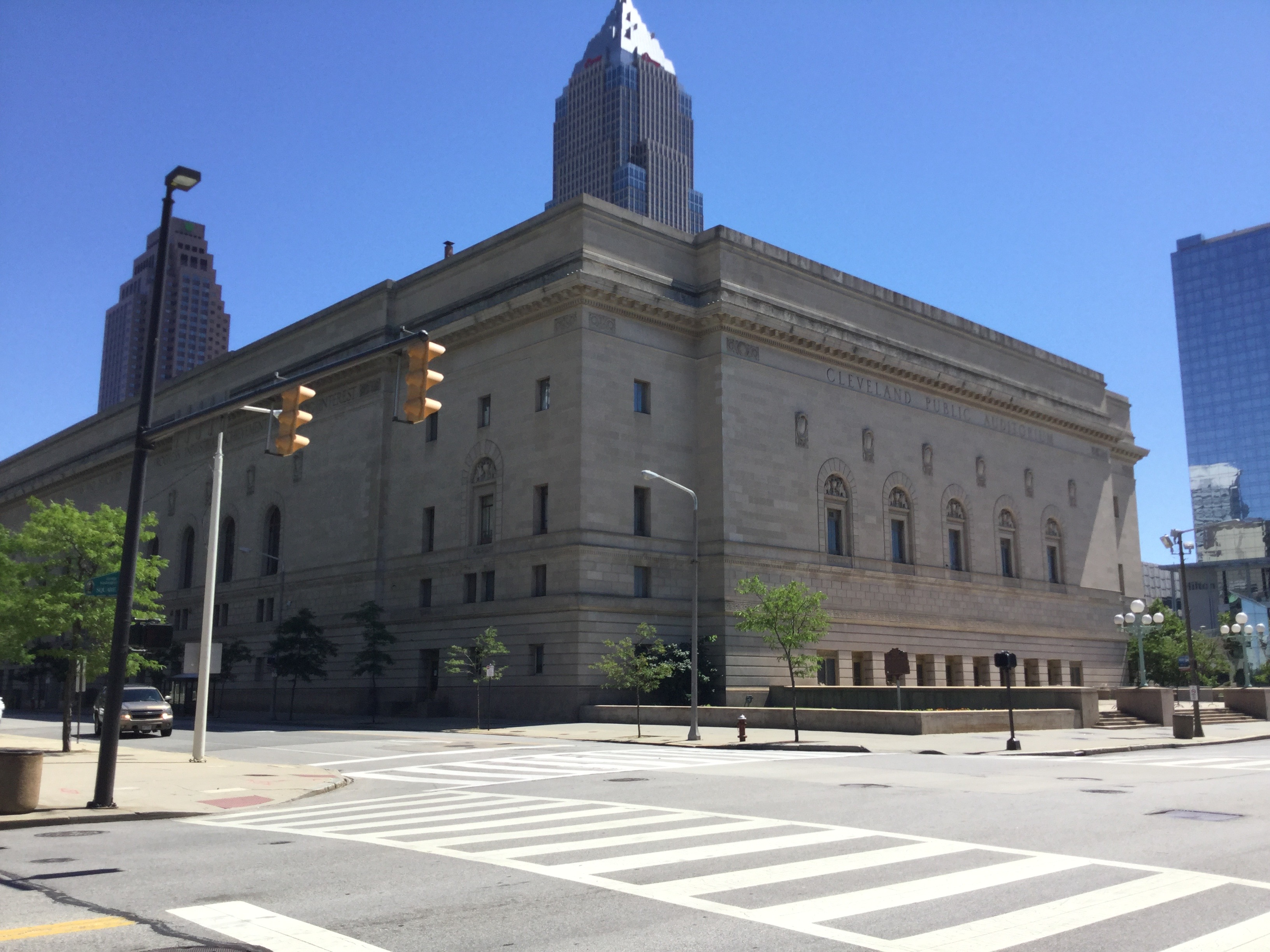
- Public Auditorium from East 6th St. and Lakeside Avenue
- Interactive map of Public Auditorium
- Location: 500 Lakeside Avenue; Cleveland, Ohio 44114
- Coordinates: 41.504061°N 81.694017°W
- Owner: City of Cleveland
- Capacity: 10,000 (main auditorium); 2,800 (Music Hall); 603 (Little Theater)
- Type: Multi-purpose facility

Construction
- Opened: 1922

Tenants
- Cleveland Rosenblums (ABL) 1925–1931; Cleveland Chase Brassmen / Allmen Transfers (NBL) 1943–1946; Cleveland State Vikings men's basketball (NCAA D-I) 1981–1989; Cleveland Charge (NBAGL) 2024–present

Website
- Official website

Public Auditorium is a multi-purpose performing arts, entertainment, sports, and exposition facility located in the civic center district of downtown Cleveland. The building features two large performance spaces: the 10,000-capacity Public Hall and the 2,800-seat Music Hall, which share a common stage. In addition, the facility also includes the 603-seat Little Theater along with several conference and meeting rooms. Since 2024, Public Hall serves as the home arena to the Cleveland Charge of the NBA G League. Although Public Auditorium was planned and funded prior to World War I, construction did not begin until 1920, and the building did not open until 1922. Designed by city architect J. Harold McDowell and Frank Walker of Walker and Weeks in a neoclassical style matching the other Group Plan buildings, it was the largest of its kind when opened, then seating 11,500.

== Construction and expansion ==
The auditorium cornerstone was laid October 20, 1920, and the completed building was dedicated April 15, 1922. Smith & Oby was one local company involved in the project, at the time the largest convention hall in the United States. The main arena floor is 300 ft × 215 ft (91 m × 66 m) and 80 ft (24 m) high. No columns were used in its construction. With all its removable seats in place on the arena floor and in the balcony, the hall could seat 13,000. The main stage is 140 ft × 60 ft (43 m × 18 m) with a 72 ft × 42 ft (22 m × 13 m) proscenium arch. A key attraction was a spectacular pipe organ, Opus 328, the largest ever built at one time by E.M. Skinner with 10,010 pipes and 150 direct speaking stops. Below ground, a basement Exhibition Hall provided more than 28,500 ft^{2} (2,650 m^{2}) of exhibition space. This space was reached by an elegant stone staircase with bronze lights which led down from Public Auditorium's lobby. But the exhibition space itself was uninviting. It had an asphalt floor, was undecorated, and was interrupted by more than 40 columns. Cleveland's Public Auditorium was considered so advanced architecturally that it became the model for similar public auditoriums in Atlantic City and Philadelphia.

== Greater Cleveland Sports Hall of Fame ==
The Greater Cleveland Sports Hall of Fame displays duplicates of many of the plaques it has awarded in the lobby at the Lakeside Avenue entrance to the Cleveland Public Auditorium.

=== 1928 and 1936 additions ===
In 1928, the Music Hall and Little Theater were added at the south end of Public Auditorium, and a terrace added to the north end. The stage between the main hall and Music Hall was shared by both halls by employing a curtain system.

In 1936, two underground spaces were added to Public Auditorium. The ballroom was built beneath Mall B of the Cleveland Mall, while the Lakeside Exhibition Hall (also known as the North Exhibition Hall) was built below Mall C between the Cuyahoga County Courthouse and Cleveland City Hall.

The seating capacity of the main auditorium, including the main floor and the U-shaped balcony, was eventually reduced to about 10,000. Music Hall seats 3,000, and the Little Theater 600.

=== 1964 alterations ===
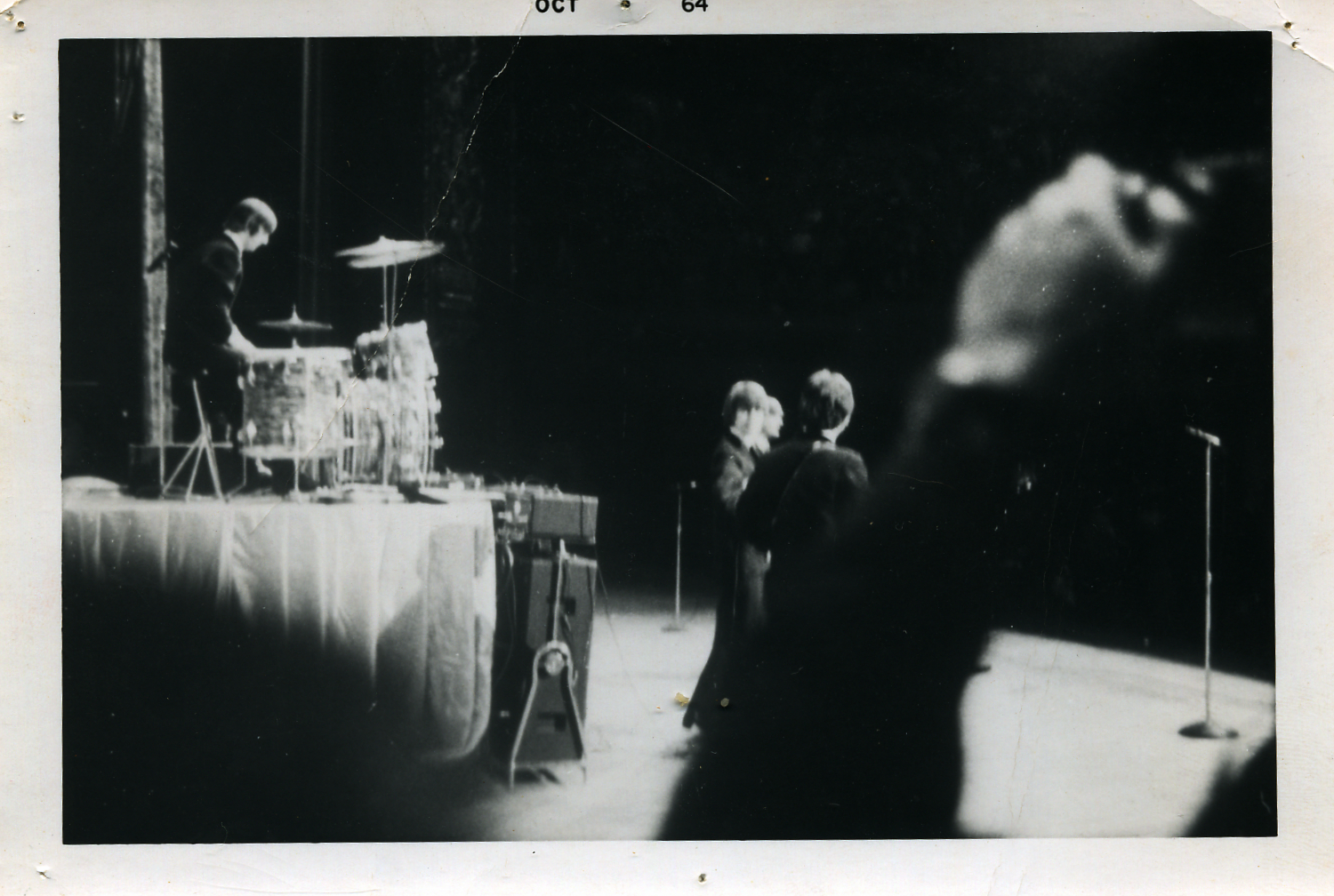
Backstage at a Beatles concert on September 15, 1964 at Cleveland Public Hall

In 1964, the city constructed a new underground convention center. The ballroom/exhibition space below Mall B was demolished and a much larger "Great Hall" (the convention center) built in its place. A tunnel was constructed below Lakeside Avenue to connect the new "Great Hall" to the Lakeside Exhibition Hall. On the west side of Public Auditorium, a four-story (one source says three-and-a-half story) modern glass and metal entrance pavilion added new lobby space for both buildings.

=== 1987 renovations ===
From 1983 to 1987, the convention center and Public Auditorium were both extensively renovated. The Exhibition Hall below Public Auditorium was radically changed, with a lobby/ballroom created out of former service space at the north end of the hall. A stone staircase was built in this area to connect the space to the hall above. This area could accommodate up to 2,000 people. The rest of the old Exhibition Hall was turned into 15 meeting rooms (ranging in size from 10 to 700 seats), office space, a cocktail lounge, and a piano bar arranged around a central block. A corridor hugged the exterior wall of the old hall, providing access to the meeting rooms. This corridor had decorative stone panels on one side and painted wood on the other, and was lined with sturdy chair upholstered in luggage fabric. The old asphalt floor was covered with concrete, and then tiled and carpeted. Cove lighting lit the corridor and meeting rooms. The Lakeside Exhibition Hall was converted into a ballroom with kitchen, and the north wall of the hall removed and replaced with a glass curtain wall that had views of Lake Erie.

The bathrooms in Public Auditorium were renovated to make them accessible as well as modern, and all public spaces in Public Auditorium were retiled, repainted, and replastered, while furniture received new upholstery. The north terrace was rebuilt in four different colors of granite. New taxicab stands were built at each end of Public Auditorium, and small gardens placed at each end of each taxi stand.

The overall decorating scheme featured colors of muted beige, blue, gray, green, and rose.

The reception pavilion received a $1.8 million ($5,101,054 in 2025 dollars) overhaul. Its exterior metal façade was removed and replaced with beige limestone. The glass curtain wall received new mechanical louvers. The interior wall coverings of dark wood paneling and bronzed aluminum were replaced with a cream-colored travertine wainscoting topped by a band of polished stone. Fabric covered the walls above the bandk, and white wooden grills were used to help break up the space. A new terrazzo floor in pastel colors was also installed. Displays about where to eat, drink, and shop in downtown Cleveland were added to the lobby, as were several kiosks where airlines could assist convention-goers in making plane reservations. Six 20-foot (6.1 m) trees were planted inside the lobby to make it more inviting, and new paving and exterior lighting were installed outside the pavilion.

A number of changes were made to the landscape around Public Auditorium. New signage with contemporary graphics were installed throughout the area. The pedestrian bridge over E. Mall Drive, which connected the upper level of the reception pavilion to Mall B, was reconfigured into a small plaza with flagpoles. Over the entrance to the pavilion hung a 40-foot (12 m) sculpture. Consisting of a number of metal flags, it spun in the wind. Around Public Auditorium, new streetlight lampposts, based on a 1922 design, were manufactured and installed. The terraces on the north and south ends of Public Auditorium were also refurbished. Both received new stone paving and new wooden benches for seating, and the plain aluminum railings were painted to look like copper. The terraces were made more friendly by also adding a number of small trees in planters. A new Postmodern-style arch was constructed to mark the entrance to the north terrace.

=== 2000s changes ===
In 2008, all seats were replaced in the balcony.

In 2010, the city sold the underground convention center to Cuyahoga County, which repurposed it to construct the new $465 million Cleveland Convention Center, connected to the Global Center for Health Innovation. The work included a $3.9 million renovation and restoration of Public Auditorium. The 1964 pavilion addition was demolished, and the building's west facade was restored.

When the neighboring Crowne Plaza was sold and renovated as the Westin Hotel Cleveland in 2013, its new owners considered building a skywalk across East 6th Street connecting it to Public Auditorium. It was not constructed.

== Events ==
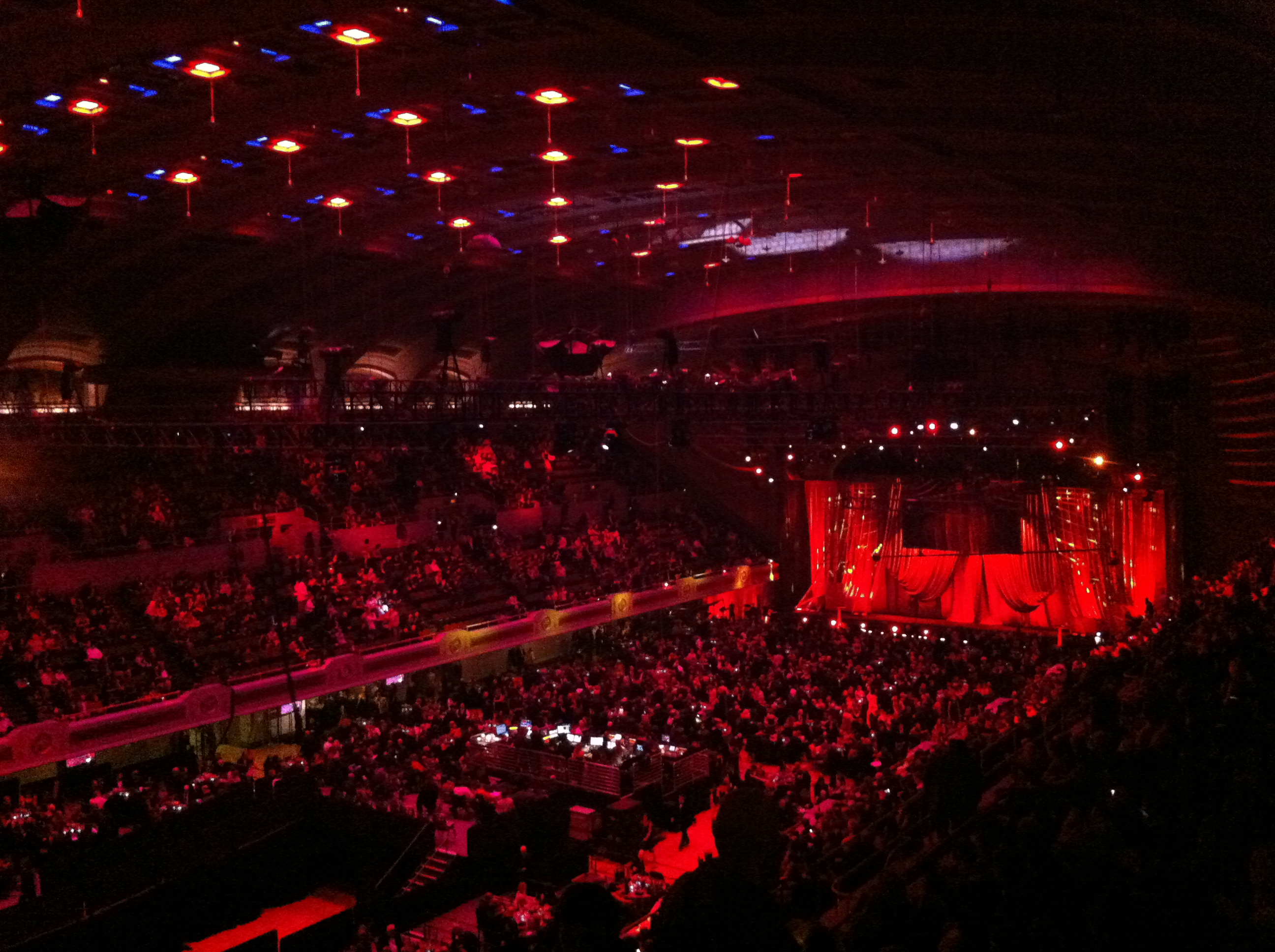
2012 Rock and Roll Hall of Fame induction ceremony held at Public Hall

Public Auditorium has hosted many notable events, including the 1924 and 1936 Republican National Conventions, General Eisenhower's address on September 23, 1952, to 15,000 supporters immediately after Richard Nixon's successful Fund Speech, and the 1993 Cleveland Orchestra 75th anniversary concert. On December 14, 1936, 11,000 spectators watched as boxer Joe Louis fought and defeated Eddie Simms at the auditorium, with Louis knocking Simms out in only 26 seconds. In 1946, jazz guitarist Django Reinhardt made his American debut at Music Hall, accompanied by pianist Duke Ellington.

Both Music Hall and Public Hall have served as venues for many rock and roll acts, including such legendary performers as Elvis Presley, the Beatles, The Doors, The Supremes, Jimi Hendrix, the Grateful Dead, Janis Joplin, and the Rolling Stones. Ozzy Osbourne's live album Tribute was recorded at Music Hall in May 1981. Canadian hard rock band Triumph's live album King Biscuit Flower Hour (In Concert) was recorded at Music Hall in October 1981. It also was the home for the Metropolitan Opera Spring Tour performances between 1924 and 1983. Its use as a concert venue declined sharply after the completion of the Wolstein Center at Cleveland State University in 1991.

The annual Rock and Roll Hall of Fame induction ceremonies have been held in Public Auditorium several times. In April 2009, it hosted the 24th induction ceremonies, the first open to the public. On April 14, 2012, the facility hosted the Hall of Fame's 27th induction ceremonies. On April 18, 2015, the facility hosted the 30th anniversary induction ceremonies. On April 14, 2018, the facility hosted the 33rd anniversary induction ceremonies.

Public Auditorium was occasionally used as a home court for the Cleveland State Vikings men's basketball team between 1981 and 1989 until the opening of the Wolstein Center. The Mid-American Conference women's basketball tournament was held in the auditorium in 2000, the tournament's first year in Cleveland. Public Hall hosted two athletic events in 2014, the first being a Fed Cup series between the United States and Italy in February, followed by the 2014 NCAA Division II Wrestling Championships in March.

The Cleveland Charge of the NBA G League announced on June 4, 2024, they would be moving their home games to Public Auditorium beginning with the 2024–25 season, leaving the nearby Wolstein Center after three seasons.
