= Captain Penny =

American television host

Publicity photo of Ron Penfound as "Captain Penny"

Captain Penny was the host of a children's television series on WEWS-TV (Channel 5) in Cleveland, Ohio from 1955 to 1971. The show starred Ron Penfound as "Captain Penny" and was produced by Earl Keyes.

Captain Penny dressed as a railroad engineer and presented a variety of old cartoons, Little Rascals and Three Stooges. The Captain Penny Show aired around noon in Cleveland from March 2, 1955, until September 4, 1971.

For many years, the show was sponsored by Bosco chocolate syrup mix. During each show, Captain Penny would mix up a glass of Bosco and milk, then drink it down with an audible "gulp".

Captain Penny's Pooch Parade segment featured pets that could be adopted from the Cleveland Animal Protective League. "Jungle Larry" would bring animals to the show from his "zoo-like" exhibit at Cedar Point in Sandusky, Ohio.

During the on-camera segments of his show, Penfound would engage in dialog with "Mister F.W. Nickelsworth" (his director, Earl Keyes, in a pun on the F.W. Woolworth chain store name). Keyes, in the control room, used the studio monitor speaker to reply. This was a violation of accepted operating practice, and created a booming, echoing off-camera voice.

Before he became a sports cartoonist for the Cleveland The Plain Dealer, Dick Dugan would appear on the show to do cartoon drawings and make animal drawings from the initials that kids mailed in to the show.

Captain Penny encouraged kids to eat everything on their plate and join the Clean Plate Club. When measles were going around, he asked kids to join the "no scratch club". After showing episodes of the Three Stooges, he would remind kids not to try this at home.

Captain Penny would say at the end of every show,

"You can fool some of the people all of the time, all of the people some of the time, but you can’t fool Mom. She's pretty nice and she's pretty smart. If you do what Mom says you won't go far wrong." (This is sometimes referred to as "Captain Penny's Rule").

In 1957, a second program was added in a late afternoon time slot Captain Penny's Fun House. The show featured Captain Penny (Ron Penfound), Wilbur Wiffenpoof (Earl Keyes) and other guests such as Bobo (an inflated clown). Captain Penny also hosted a 2-hour show Captain Penny's Fun Farm on Saturday mornings.

Mr. Jingeling made yearly appearances between Thanksgiving and Christmas beginning in 1957. He was "Keeper of the Keys" to Santa's workshop and he would tell stories about the North Pole. Mr. Jingeling was sponsored by Halle's, a local department store, and also acted as Santa's representative in the store, in which he could be found on the seventh floor. Appropriately named Earl Keyes played the part from 1964 on even after Jingeling stopped appearing on TV.
