= United States Food Administration =

Former US federal agency (1917–1920)

Agency overview
- Formed: 1917; 109 years ago
- Dissolved: 1920; 106 years ago
- Jurisdiction: Federal government of the United States
- Headquarters: Washington, D.C.
- Agency executive: Herbert Hoover, Administrator
- Website: www.archives.gov/publications/prologue/2017/summer/poh-wwi-posters

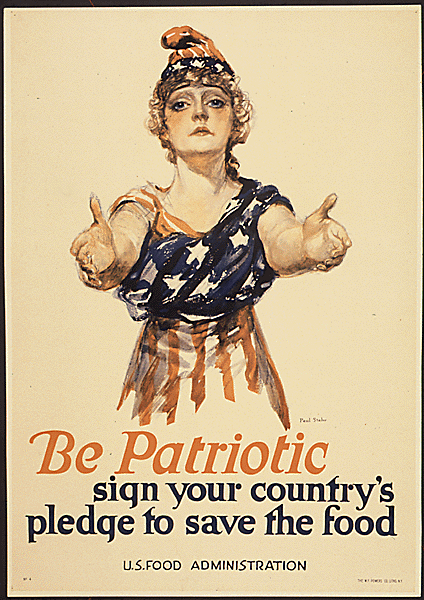
Poster with a patriotic theme to save food (1917), issued when domestic food restrictions were applied to support the war effort.

The United States Food Administration (1917–1920) was an independent federal agency that controlled the production, distribution, and conservation of food in the U.S. during the country's participation in World War I. It was established to prevent monopolies and hoarding, and to maintain government control of foods through voluntary agreements and licensing. The agency was established by Executive Order 2679-A of August 10, 1917, pursuant to the Food and Fuel Control Act, and was abolished by Executive Order 3320 on August 21, 1920. Herbert Hoover was appointed to serve as Food Administrator.

One of the agency's important tasks was the stabilization of the price of wheat on the U.S. market. Concepts such as "meatless Mondays" and "wheatless Wednesdays" were also implemented to help ration food, so that the government could prioritize the war effort.

Branches of the United States Food Administration were set up in all states as well as Alaska, Hawaii, Puerto Rico and Washington, D.C. The agency had broad powers but few mechanisms for enforcement of its policies. It relied largely upon patriotic appeals and voluntary compliance in the formal absence of rationing.

== History ==
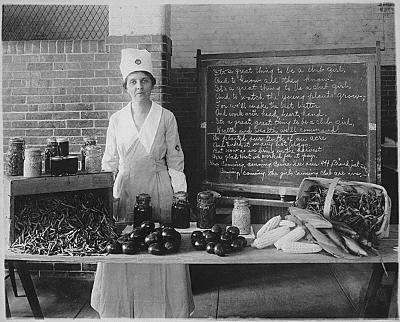
Mina Van Winkle, in Food Administration uniform, explains Victory gardening and explains recommended food processing.

=== The appointment of Hoover ===
Woodrow Wilson realised he would need a dynamic leader to ensure the Food administration was effective. His advisor Edward House suggested Herbert Hoover, who had previously run the Commission for Relief in Belgium. Walter Hines Page, the British ambassador, endorsed this choice and Wilson, a Democrat, agreed although Hoover was a Republican. Hoover accepted the position only on the basis that he would have a completely free hand as regards the Washington bureaucracy, which in particular referred to David F. Houston, the Secretary of Agriculture. Despite initial resistance, Houston acquiesced and Hoover was appointed.

=== Grain Corporation ===
The administration employed its Grain Corporation, organized under the provisions of the Food Control Act of August 10, 1917, as an agency for the purchase and sale of foodstuffs. Having done transactions in the size of $7 billion, the United States Food Administration was rendered obsolete by the armistice in Europe. President Woodrow Wilson promoted its transition in a new agency for the support of the reconstruction of Europe. It became the American Relief Administration, approved by an Act (Public, No. 274, 65th Congress) on February 25, 1919.

The Food Administration Grain Corporation became the United States Grain Corporation pursuant to Executive Order 3087 of May 14, 1919.

== Legacy and aftermath ==
Much of what is known of the organization after the close of official operations comes from the Memoirs of Herbert Hoover. Where the highly successful and unprecedented scale of operations the organization managed to achieve is concerned, Hoover says:

My experience in the Food Administration, and in the reconstruction of Europe after the Armistice, had demonstrated a woeful lack of scientific approach to our national food problems in the mass. Therefore in 1920 I proposed to the Carnegie Corporation that a research institute, devoted exclusively to this subject, should be established at Stanford University. I proposed that its work should be with products after they left the farmer. It was to study processing and distribution with a view to eliminating waste and improving standards and quality and preventing fraud; to study nutritional questions in different groups and areas; and also to study existing regulatory methods and the legislative proposals for price-fixing, etc.

Statistics and questions of production were already well taken care of by the various governmental agencies and the agricultural colleges.

The idea appealed strongly to Mr. Elihu Root, then Chairman of the Carnegie Board. That institution granted us $70,000 a year for ten years, and subsequently an endowment of about $750,000 was given to the Institute. Dr. Alonzo E. Taylor was made the Director. The Institute has been fruitful in results.

== Poster gallery ==
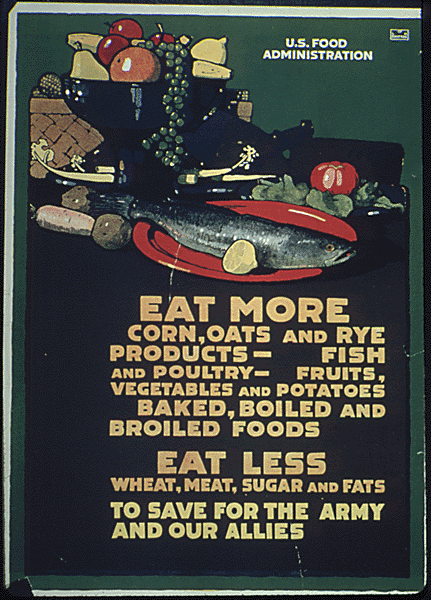

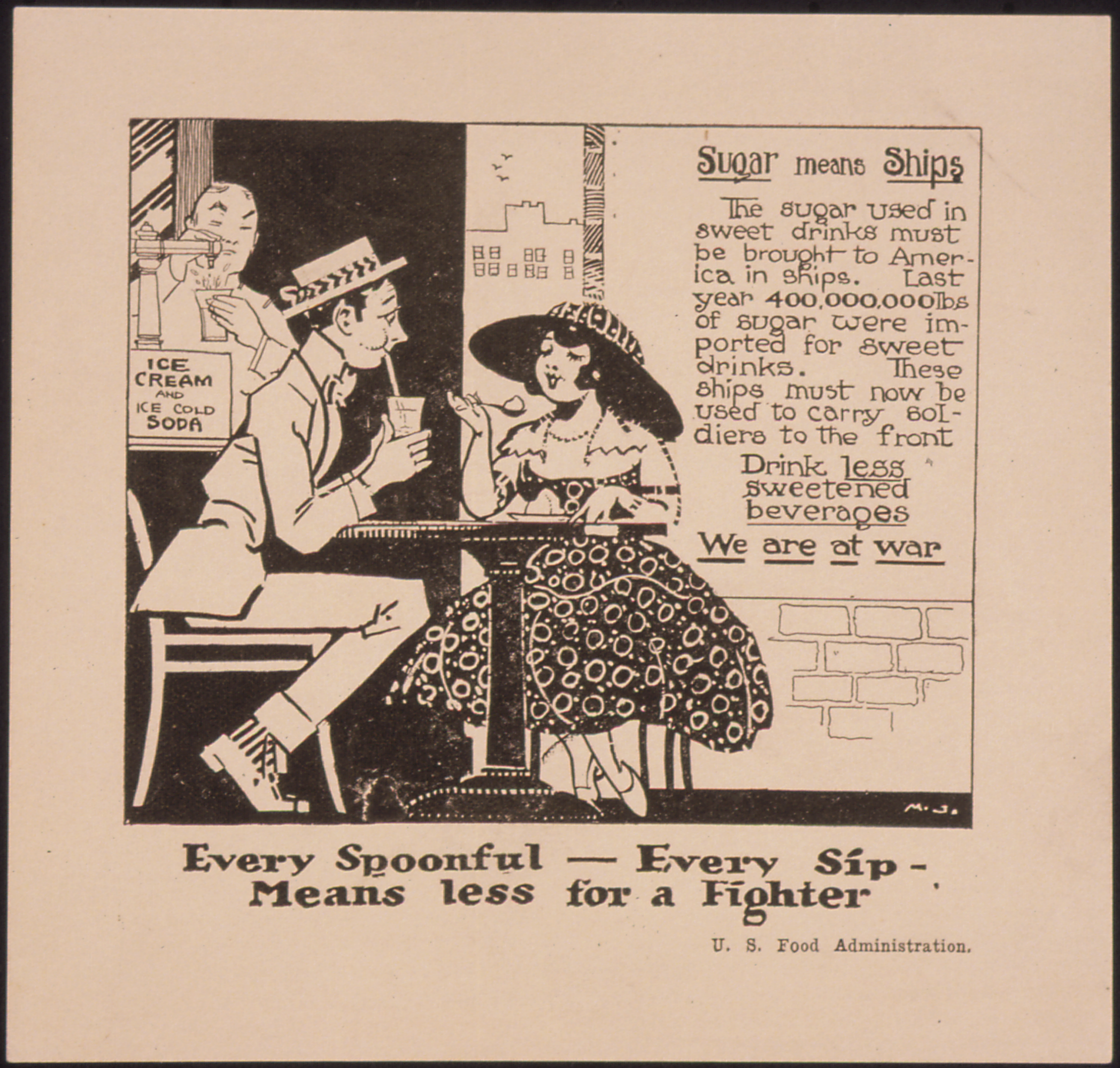

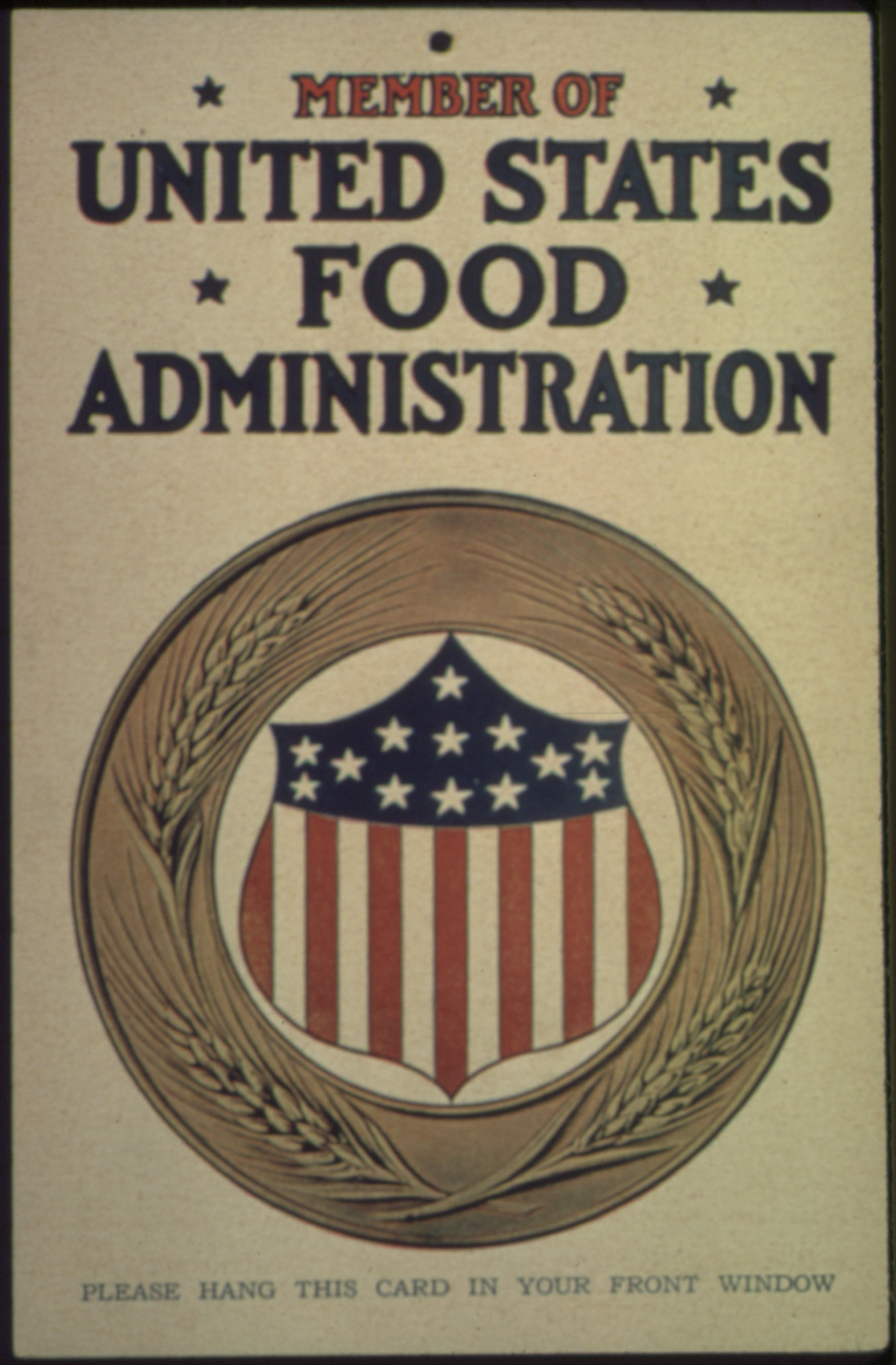

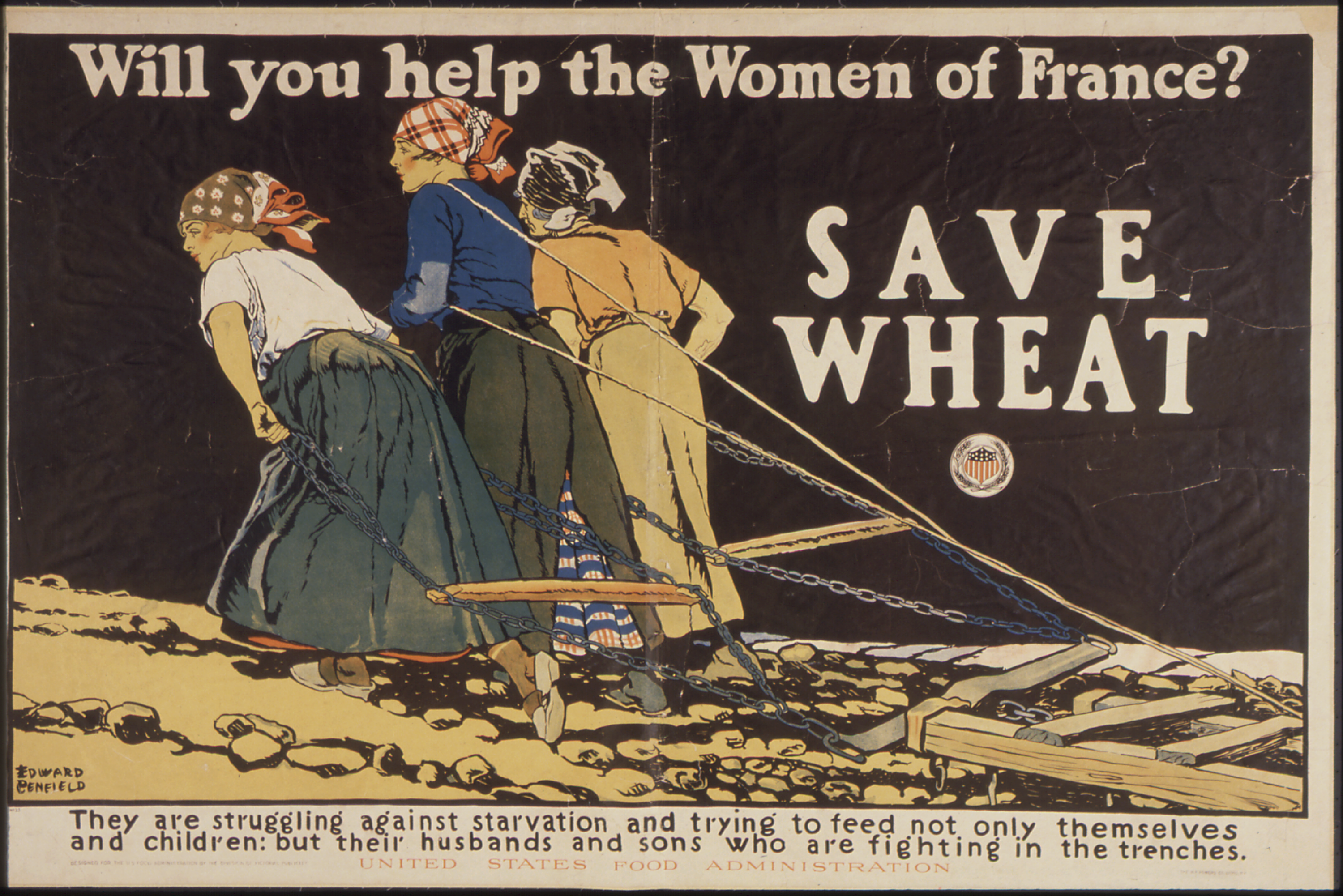

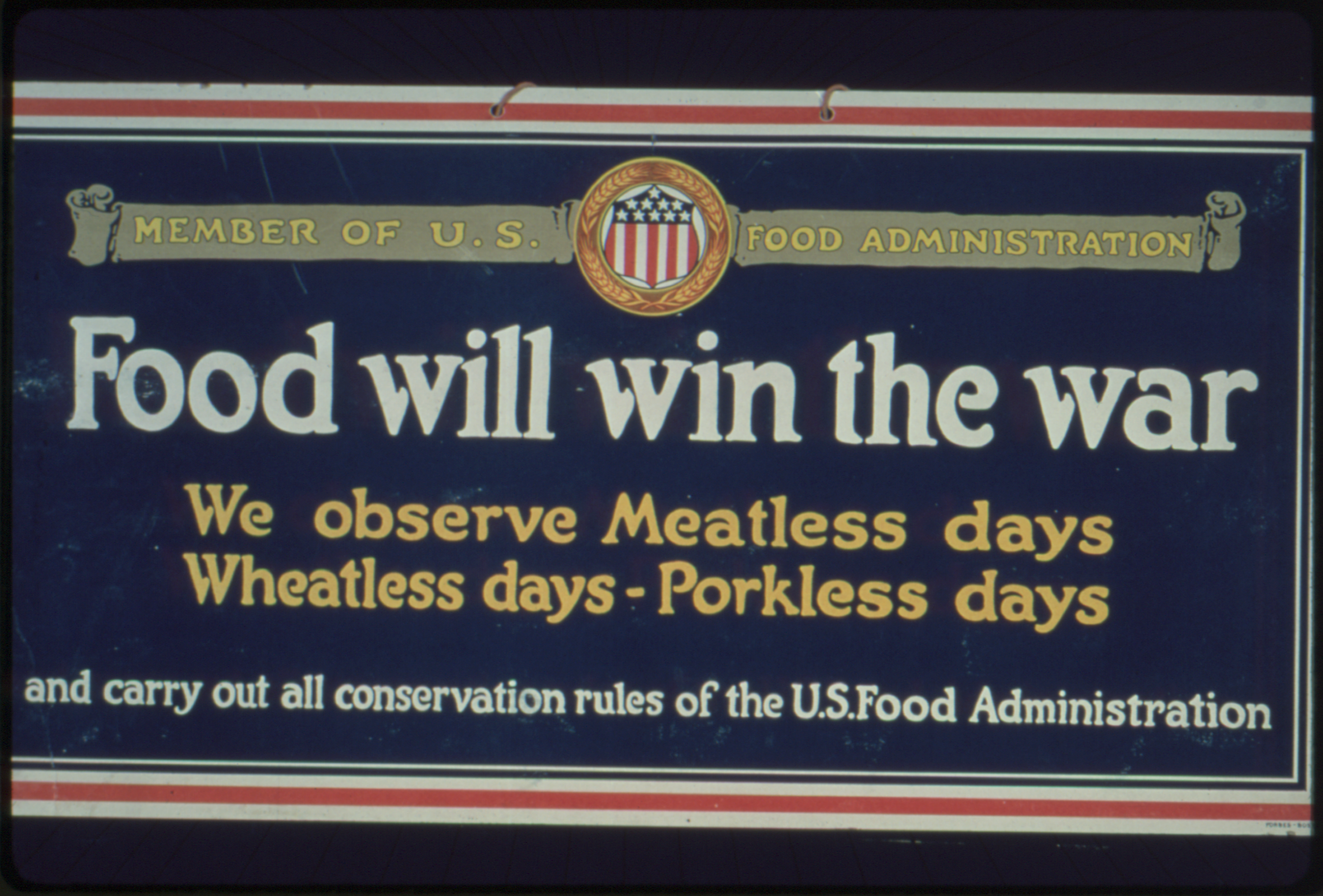

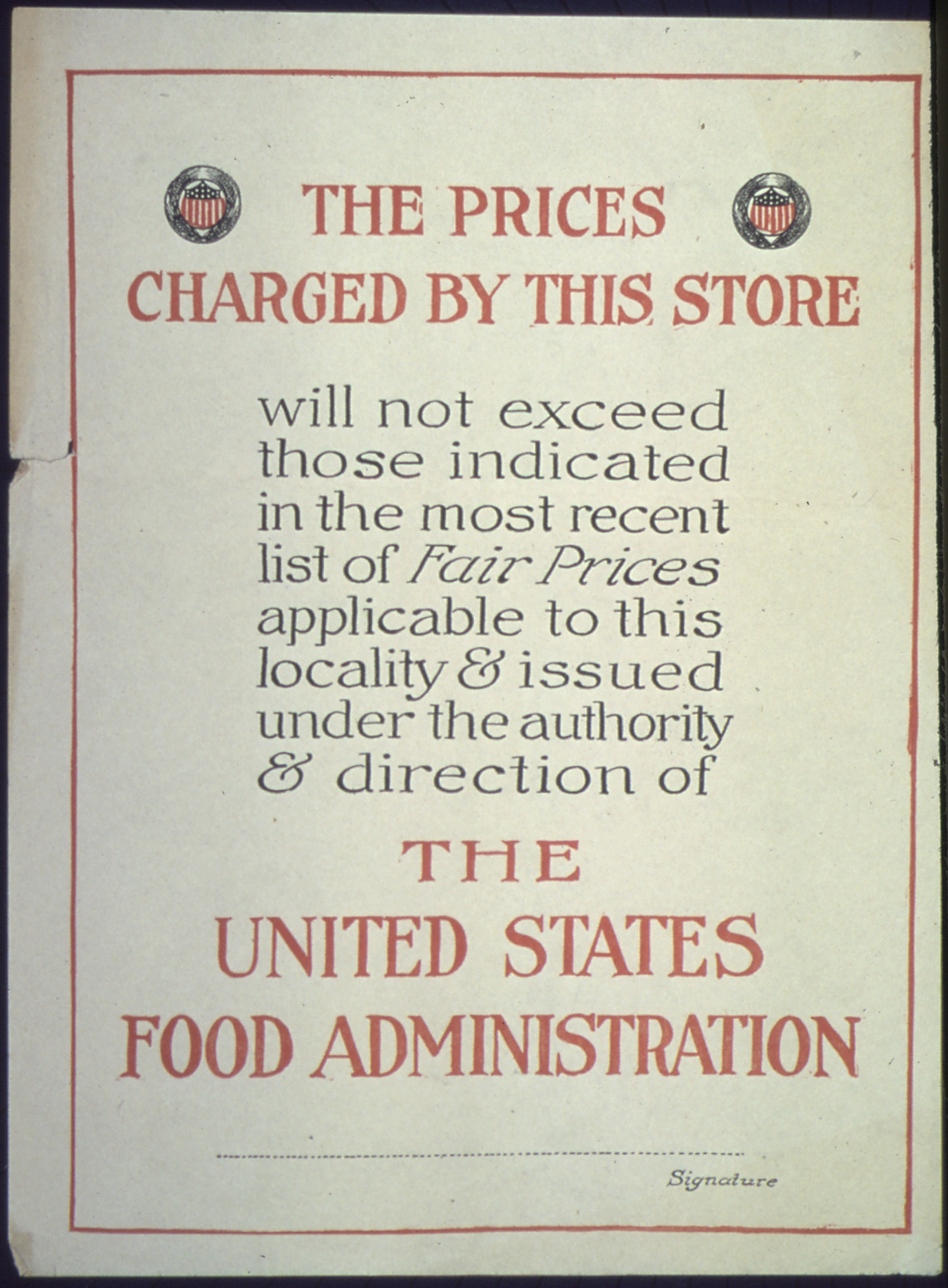

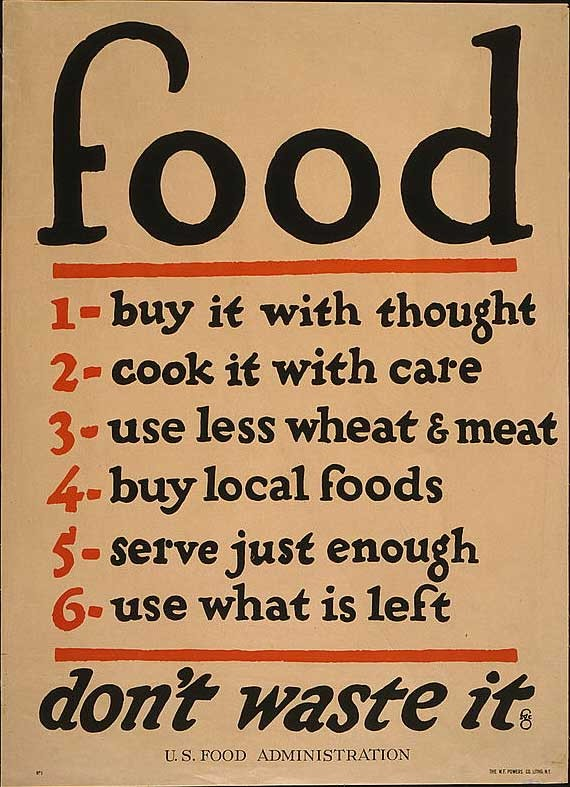

== See also ==
- Clean Plate Club
