= Clean Plate Club =

1917 political campaign motivated by the War

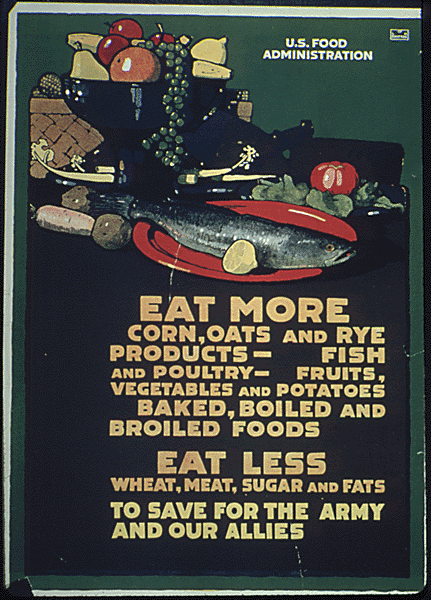

The Clean Plate Club was the beginning of a campaign first established in 1917 when the United States Congress passed the Food and Fuel Control Act or Lever Act. This gave the President the power to "regulate the distribution, export, import, purchase and storage of food." President Woodrow Wilson released Executive order 2679-A creating the U.S. Food Administration and appointed Herbert Hoover as the head, enforcing this act. This organization was given the task of making sure that the limited amount of food America had as a result of World War I didn’t go to waste, and to avoid importation of food as much as possible. Hoover knew that many Americans were willing to volunteer and had a strong sense of patriotism during the war, so he used that to his advantage when he advertised the idea of the “Clean Plate” campaign. Hoover promoted this idea to children who attended school with a pledge that read, “At table I’ll not leave a scrap of food upon my plate. And I’ll not eat between meals, but for supper time I’ll wait.” This targeted children too young to understand the value of food in the difficult economic time. Many necessities such as flour and sugar were in short supply, so Hoover used a sense of American nationalism to encourage families to take appropriate rations and save food. His goal was for people to eat less, use less essential ingredients, and to finish their entire meal. By doing this, young children developed the habit of eating everything given to them, thus “cleaning their plate.”

== Creating the club ==
The U.S. Food Administration was terminated after the First World War, but in 1947 the “Clean Plate” proposal came back and was encouraged by President Harry S. Truman, who aided in officially forming the “Clean Plates Club” in elementary schools across the country. This club was officially created after the Great Depression and World War II, when food was once again scarce. In 1947, the U.S. created the Marshall Plan, in which President Truman encouraged Americans to consume less poultry, to conserve food for starving Europeans. As a reaction to his plan, the “Clean Plate Clubs” were formed, and elementary school students were again taught to clean their plates.

== Currently ==
This concept now puts Americans at risk of unhealthy life styles. Studies show that 64% of Americans are now in danger of being overweight or obese. The ideal of completely finishing a serving in the United States has now become a bad habit, as food in America is no longer in short supply, and finishing the remainder of a meal is no longer considered crucial. Today, portion sizes have increased considerably, shown by the fact that a serving of french fries today is twice the size of a 1950s serving, making “cleaning the plate” an unhealthy dietary action. It has been shown that parents who push their children to eat their entire meal may interfere with the self-control of their child, thus leading them to overeat, as well as creating a misunderstanding of an appropriate serving size. Some “Clean Plate” cases may turn into psychological problems, or lead to developing eating disorders. Health experts indicate that completely finishing meals contributes to obesity and continuous health problems such as cancer, heart disease, stroke, and diabetes.
