= Ron Penfound =

American television personality (1927–1974)

- Penfound as Captain Penny
- Born: Ronald A. Penfound; January 28, 1927; Elyria, Ohio, U.S.
- Died: September 16, 1974 (aged 47); Naples, Florida, U.S.
- Occupations: TV sports anchor; Radio announcer; Floorman
- Years active: 1950–1974
- Spouses: Gail Gilmore (married 1951–1959, divorced); Phyllis Yoder Hunter (married 1960–1964, her death); JoAnn Dudas (married 1967–1974, his death)
- Children: 5

Ronald A. Penfound was a radio announcer and local television personality in the Cleveland, Ohio, market, specifically on WEWS-TV channel 5 where from 1955 to 1971 he hosted an afternoon program for children. As host, he was known as Captain Penny and was attired in railroad engineer clothing.

== Early life ==
Ron Penfound was born on January 28, 1927, in Elyria, Ohio, to Archie and Marjorie (Saywell) Penfound, and served in the U.S. Navy during World War II.

He attended Kenyon College and shared a dorm with actor Paul Newman. He had originally planned to become an Episcopal priest, but then transferred to study broadcasting at the University of Denver.

== Career ==
Penfound worked as a radio announcer at KLMR in Lamar, Colorado, while attending school (1950). He was an announcer for KVOD in Denver before returning to Elyria as news and sports director at WEOL radio. He also worked at Cleveland radio station WERE as an announcer and salesman.

On April 26, 1953, Penfound was hired as a sports announcer and floorman for WEWS-TV, and began hosting the Captain Penny program on March 2, 1955. During the course of its 16 years on the air, the show featured old cartoons, along with Little Rascals and Three Stooges shorts. In addition, there were live appearances by Captain Penny and a variety of guests. Following a 1961 appearance by actor Chuck Connors, Penfound was given a small role in Connors' show, The Rifleman, in the fourth-season episode #15, "The Princess", in which he played Mr. Smith. It aired 7/13/1961.

During the holiday season, the character of Mr. Jingeling, played by the show's producer, Earl Keyes, would appear. Throughout the year, a feature of the daily program was on a certain day of the week, Captain would present animals from the Cuyahoga County Animal Protective League available for adoption. The segment was known as Captain Penny's Pooch Parade.

In 1957, a second program was added in a late afternoon time slot Captain Penny's Fun House. The show featured Captain Penny (Ron Penfound), Wilbur Wiffenpoof (Earl Keyes) and other guests such as Bobo (an inflated clown). Captain Penny also hosted a 2-hour show Captain Penny's Fun Farm on Saturday mornings.

Captain Penny would close his daily program with the words of advice to his little viewers: "You can fool some of the people all of the time, all of the people some of the time, but you can’t fool Mom. She's pretty nice and she's pretty smart. Do what Mom says, and you won't go far wrong."

After the Captain Penny show had its final broadcast on September 4, 1971, Penfound served as weekend weatherman and staff announcer at WEWS. He was also the public address announcer for the Cleveland Indians from 1969 to 1972. Upon leaving the station in 1972, Penfound worked as a sales manager and sportscaster for WKBK in Keene, New Hampshire for one year, before moving to Florida, where he worked in both radio and television.

== Personal life ==
Penfound married Gail Gilmore in 1951 and had one child, Amy, but their marriage ended in divorce in 1959. He then married Phyllis Yoder Hunter in 1960, with the couple having two children, Tracy and Matthew. Phyllis committed suicide on May 10, 1964, when she jumped off the Cuyahoga River Bridge of the Ohio Turnpike in nearby Summit County. On May 20, 1967, Penfound married JoAnn Dudas and had two children, Julie and Samantha.

=== Death ===
Although Captain Penny never appeared on camera with a cigarette, Ron Penfound was a cigarette smoker. He died of lung cancer in Naples, Florida, on September 16, 1974. He was 47.
