= Westin Hotel Cleveland =

Coordinates: 41°30′12.7″N 81°41′29.3″W

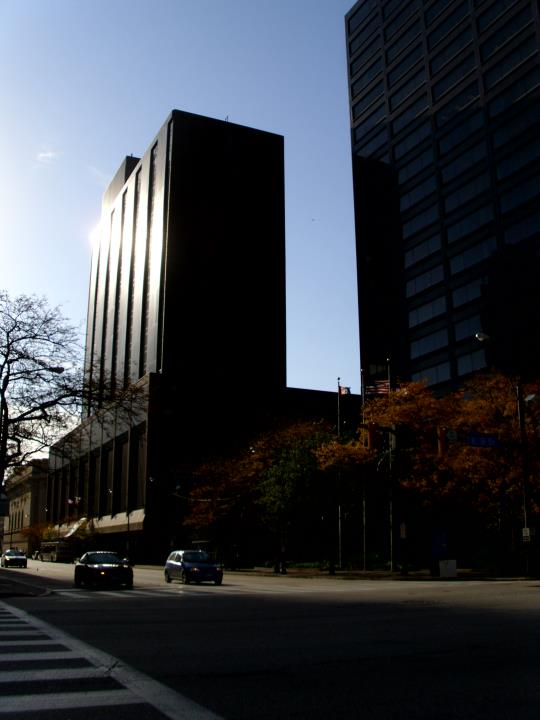
- Interactive map of the Westin Hotel Cleveland area
- Former names: Sheraton Downtown, Crowne Plaza Downtown

General information
- Type: Hotel
- Location: 777 E St. Clair Cleveland, Ohio 44114 United States
- Construction started: 1973
- Completed: 1975

Height
- Roof: 67.67 m (222 ft)

Technical details
- Floor count: 22

Design and construction
- Architect: Bialosky & Manders

Other information
- Number of rooms: 484

The Westin Hotel Cleveland is a modernist 1975-opened 222 foot, 22 story, 484 room Westin high-rise hotel in downtown Cleveland in the city's Civic Center district. The tower rooms sit on top of a multi-story built-in parking garage. The hotel sits along St. Clair Avenue and features rainbow lighting running length wise along its multilevel parking deck at night. This is the only Westin high-end hotel in Cleveland, the other two in the state being in Cincinnati and Columbus.

Originally, in the 1990s there was to be a Westin Hotel built in Cleveland in The Flats and was to have 416 rooms; however this project never materialized. The Westin here then completes plans to have a Westin present in the central city since at least the late 1980s.

== History ==
The Westin was built as the Bond Court Hotel in the mid-1970s with the intent of being linked to the neighboring Penton Media Building but partially collapsed when originally under construction in 1974. On the site where the Westin now stands used to be the Auditorium Hotel, which was razed to make way for the Bond Court Hotel in the early 1970s.

The property was formerly known as the Sheraton Downtown (when Sheraton took over operation in the 1980s) and Crowne Plaza Downtown Cleveland until the mid-2000s. In serious decline since the 1990s, The Crowne Plaza hotel was renovated in 2013–2014 and was rechristened a Westin, before opening in May 2014. Though the hotel marked its 40th birthday in 2015, the building has not been in continuous use for nearly that many years, for at least two years in the 2000s, the property sat unused.

== Rebranding ==
The color facing of the tower was changed during this time from dull brown to off-white in keeping with the new "tidy" look of the structure. The hotel is across the street from the Cleveland Public Hall to its west.

== See also ==
- List of tallest buildings in Cleveland
