= History of Cleveland =

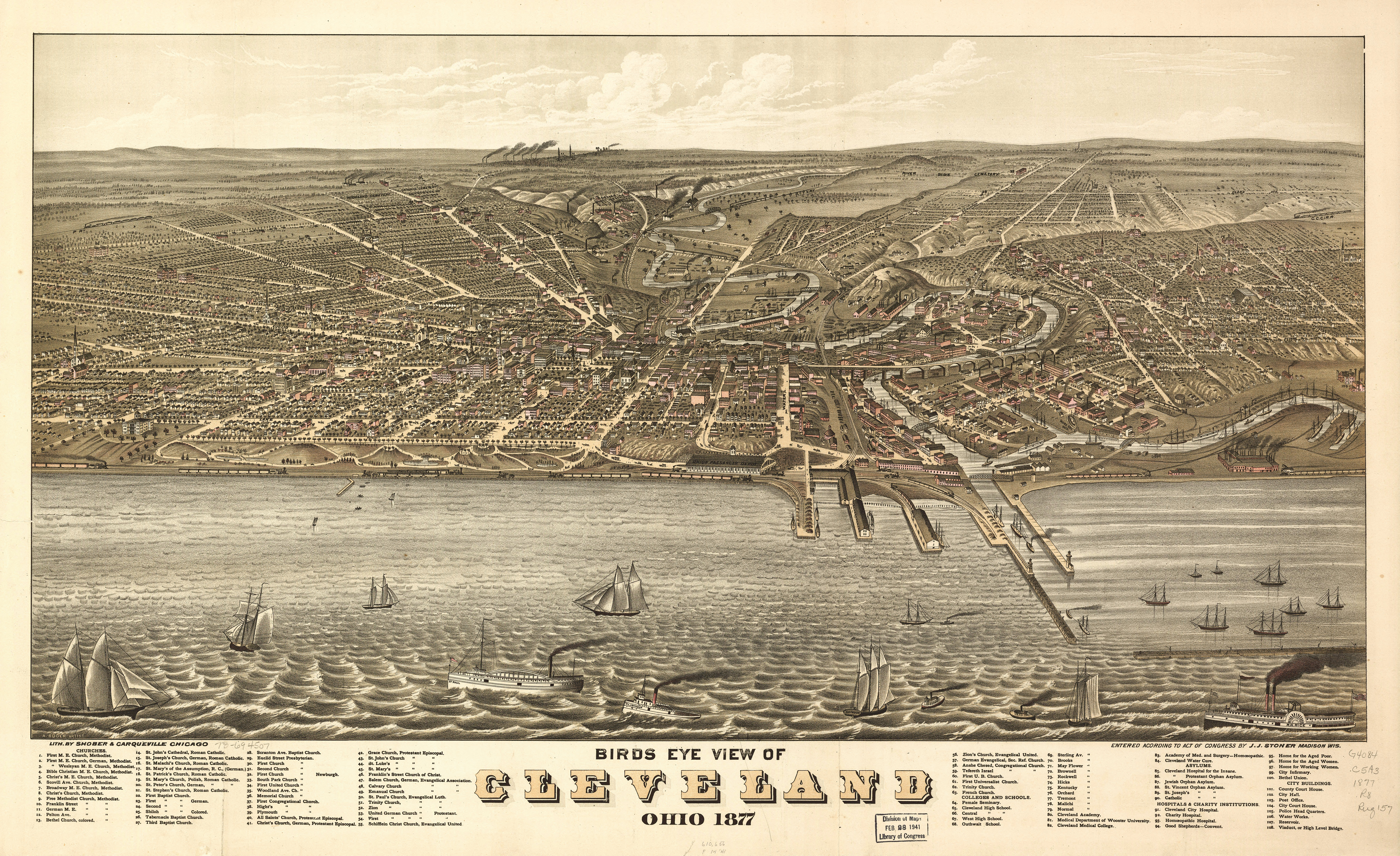
Bird's-eye view map of Cleveland in 1877

The city of Cleveland, Ohio, was founded by General Moses Cleaveland of the Connecticut Land Company on July 22, 1796. Its central location on the southern shore of Lake Erie and the mouth of the Cuyahoga River allowed it to become a major center for Great Lakes trade in northern Ohio in the early 19th century. An important Northern city during the American Civil War, Cleveland grew into a major industrial metropolis and a gateway for European and Middle Eastern immigrants, as well as African American migrants, seeking jobs and opportunity.

For most of the 20th century, Cleveland was one of America's largest cities, but after World War II, it suffered from post-war deindustrialization and suburbanization. The city has pursued a gradual recovery since the 1980s, becoming a major national center for healthcare and the arts by the early 21st century.

== Prehistory ==
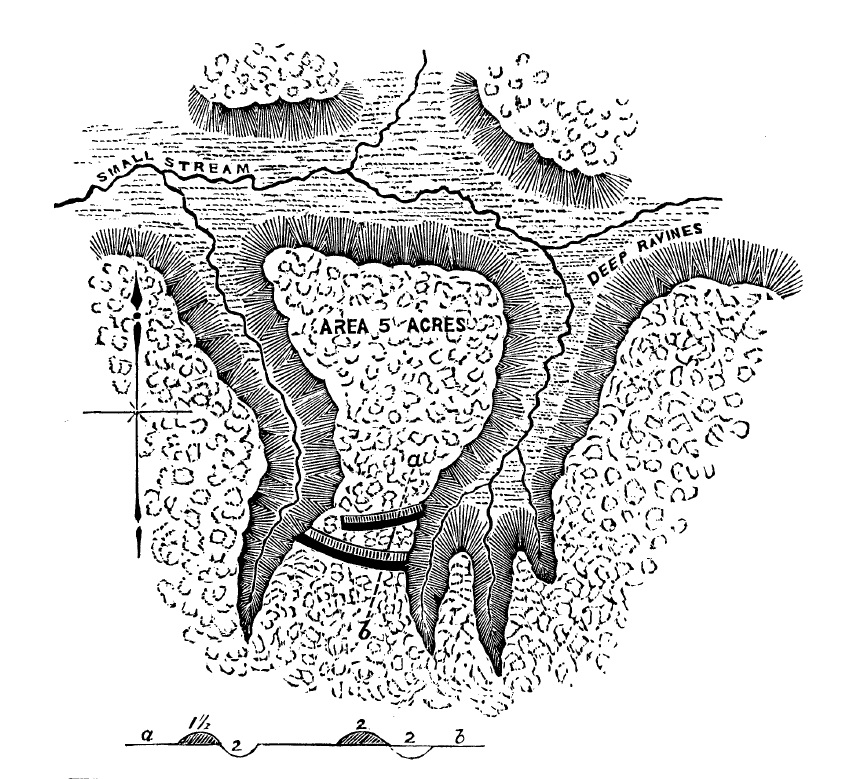
A semi-permanent encampment of the Woodland people or the Whittlesey culture, located about the modern intersection of Broadway Avenue and Aetna Road in Cleveland. Drawn by Charles Whittlesey, 1867.

At the end of the Last Glacial Period, which ended about 15,000 years ago at the southern edge of Lake Erie, there was a tundra landscape. It took about two and a half millennia to turn this wet and cold landscape drier and warmer, so that caribou, moose, deer, wolves, bears and cougars were prevalent.

The oldest human, paleo-Indian traces reach back as far as 10500 BC. There was an early settlement in Medina County, dated between 9200 and 8850 BC. Some tools consisted of flint from Indiana.

Rising temperatures at about 7500 BC led to a stable phase between 7000 and 4500 BC which had similar characteristics to today's climate. Population grew, and these members of the so-called Early Archaic Culture lived in large families along the rivers and the shores of the lakes. During the warm seasons they met for hunting and gathering. The technology of tools improved but flint was still an important resource in that regard. Important archaeological sites are old Lake Abraham bog as well as sites on Big Creek, Cahoon, Mill and Tinker's Creek. There was a larger settlement where Hilliard Boulevard crosses the Rocky River.

Population density further increased during the Middle Archaic period (4500-2000 BC). Ground and polished stone tools and ornaments, and a variety of specialized chipped-stone notched points and knives, scrapers and drills were found on sites at Cuyahoga, Rocky River, Chippewa Creek, Tinker's, and Griswold Creek.

The Late Archaic period (2000 to 500 BC) coincided with a much warmer climate than today. For the first time evidence for regionally specific territories occurs, as well as limited gardening of squash, which later became very important. A long-distance trade of raw materials and finished artifacts with coastal areas, objects which were used in ceremonies and burials. The largest graveyard known is at the junction of the East and West branches of the Rocky River. Differences in status are revealed by the objects which accompanied the dead, like zoo- and anthropomorphic objects or atlatls.

The following Early Woodland (500 BC – AD 100) and Middle Woodland (AD 100 – 700) is a period of increased ceremonial exchange and sophisticated rituals. Crude but elaborately decorated pottery appears. Squash becomes more important, maize occurs for ritual procedures. The first Mounds were erected, buildings for which Ohio is world-famous. The mound at Eagle St. Cemetery belongs to the Adena culture. Further mounds were found in the east of Tinker's Creek. Horticulture becomes even more important, the same with maize. The huge mounds concentrate much more in southern Ohio, but they were also found in northern Summit County. Some Hopewellian projectile points, flint-blade knives, and ceramics were found in the area of Cleveland itself. One mound, south of Brecksville, contained a cache of trade goods within a 6-sided stone crypt. A smaller mound between Willowick and Eastlake contained several ceremonial spear points of chert from Illinois – altogether signs of a wide range of trade. At Cleveland's W. 54th St. Division waterworks there was probably a mound and a Hopewellian spear tip was found there.

After AD 400 maize dominated. Mounds were built no more, but the number of different groups increased, with winter villages at the Cuyahoga, Rocky and Lower Chagrin Rivers. Small, circular houses contained one or two fire hearths and storage pits. Tools and ornaments made of antler and bone were found. During the spring, people lived camps along the lakeshore ridges, along ponds and bogs, or headwaters of creeks, where they collected plants and fished.

Between AD 1000 and 1200 oval houses with single-post constructions dominated the summer villages, the emphasis on burial ceremony declined, but became more personal and consisted of ornaments, or personal tools.

From 1200 to 1600 Meso-American influence mediated by the Mississippian culture could be traced, in Cleveland in new ceramic and house styles, new crops (common beans), and the presence of materials traded from southern centers. This influence was even stronger within the Fr. Ancient group, probably ancestors of later Shawnees. At this time, there was an obvious difference in archaeological findings from the areas of Black River, Sandusky River and Lake Erie Islands westwards on the one hand and Greater Cleveland eastwards on the other.

Between 1300 and 1500 agriculture became predominant, especially beans and new varieties of maize. Larger villages were inhabited in summer and fall. Small camps diminished and the villages became larger as well as the houses, which became rectangular. Some of the villages became real fortresses. During the later Whittlesey Tradition burial grounds were placed outside the villages, but still close to them. These villages were in use all year round.

The final Whittlesey Tradition, beginning at about 1500, shows long-houses, fortified villages, and sweat lodges can be traced. But the villages in and around Cleveland reported by Charles Whittlesey, are gone. It was likely a warlike time, as the villages were even more strongly fortified than before. Cases of traumatic injury, nutritional deficiency, and disease were also found. It is obvious that the population declined until about 1640. One reason is probably the little ice-age beginning at about 1500. The other reason is probably permanent warfare. It seems that the region of Cleveland was uninhabited between 1640 and 1740.

== 18th and 19th centuries ==
=== Seneca village and trading post period, 1740s ===
Decades prior to the establishment of Cleveland, at the confluence of Lake Erie and the Cuyahoga River was a Native American village of mostly Seneca people. An Irish-born fur trader named George Croghan established a trading post there, learned the local languages, and visited periodically between 1745 and 1748. French traders did not take kindly to the establishment of a competing trading post on Lake Erie and became hostile towards Croghan. During a later conflict with the French in Sandusky, Wyandot Chief Nicholas Orontony led his people from Sandusky towards the Cuyahoga village. Cleveland is known in Seneca as Gayáha’geh.

=== Revolutionary War period, 1778 ===
In 1778, during the American Revolutionary War, the British had established a small magazine in a Native American village on the Cuyahoga River, likely somewhere close to where it empties into Lake Erie in the current city limits of Cleveland.

=== Survey and establishment, 1796–1820 ===
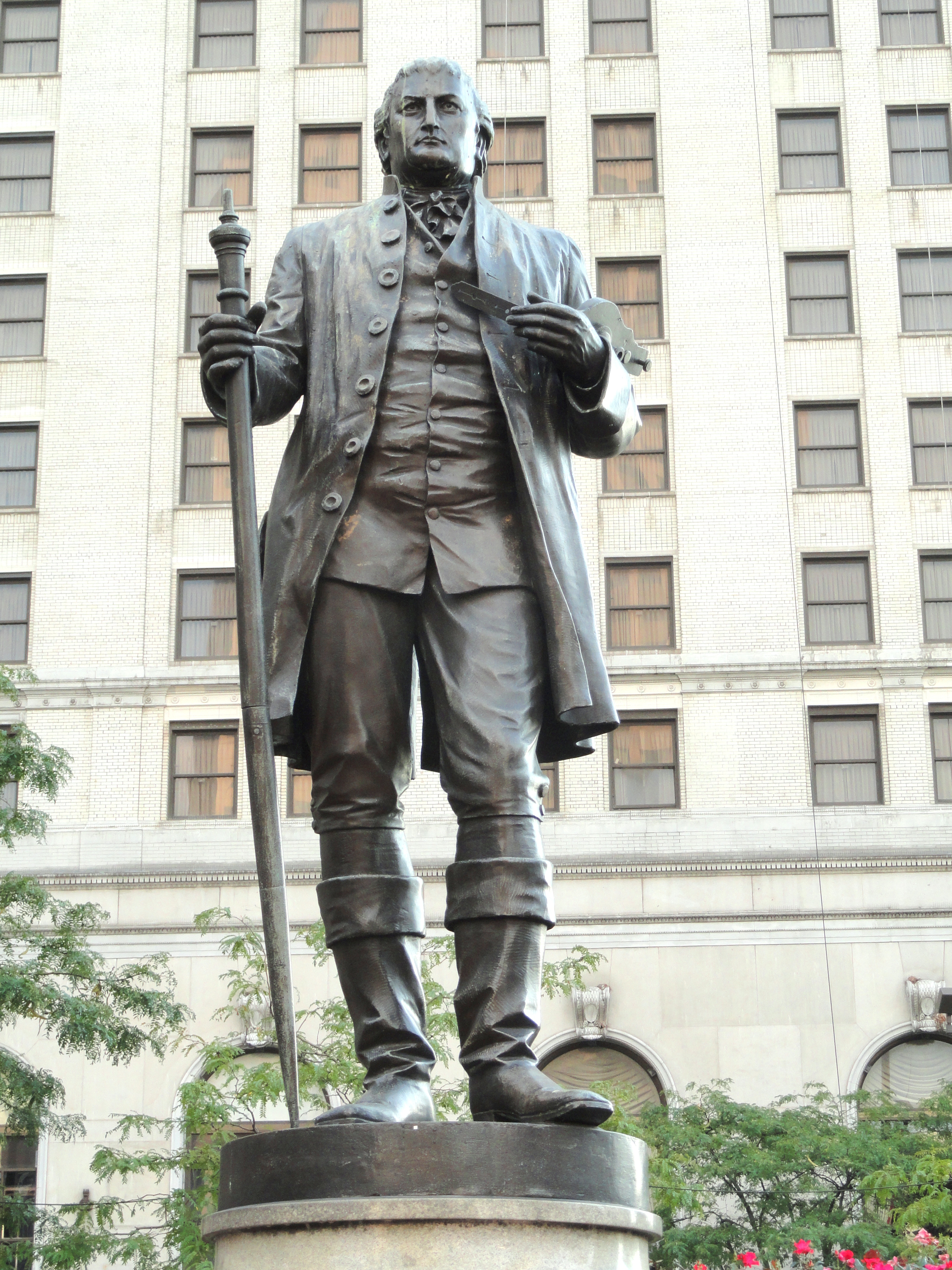
Moses Cleaveland statue on Public Square

As one of thirty-six founders of the Connecticut Land Company, General Moses Cleaveland was selected as one of its seven directors and was subsequently sent out as the company's agent to map and survey the company's holdings. A Seneca chief named Stigwanish guided Cleaveland and his surveyor party. On July 22, 1796, Cleaveland and his surveyors arrived at the mouth of the Cuyahoga River. Cleaveland quickly saw the land, which had previously belonged to Native Americans, as an ideal location for the "capital city" of the Connecticut Western Reserve. Cleaveland and his surveyors quickly began making plans for the new city. He paced out a nine-and-a-half-acre Public Square, similar to those in New England. His surveyors decided upon the name, Cleaveland, after their leader. In October, Cleaveland returned to Connecticut where he pursued his ambition in political, military, and law affairs, never once returning to Ohio. The town's name was often shortened to "Cleveland," even by Cleaveland's original surveyors. A common myth emerged that the spelling was altered by The Cleveland Advertiser in order to fit the name on the newspaper's masthead.

Stigwanish remained at the settlement with other Seneca people. Schoolteachers Job Phelps Stiles (born c. 1769 in Granville, Massachusetts) and his wife Talitha Cumi Elderkin (born 1779 in Hartford, Connecticut) were two of only three original settlers who stayed there over the first winter of 1796–1797 when, attended by Seneca Native American women, Talitha Cumi gave birth to Charles Phelps Stiles, the first white child born in the Western Reserve. They lived at first on Lot 53, the present corner of Superior Avenue and West 3rd Street adjacent to the future Terminal Tower, but later moved southeast to higher ground in Newburgh, Ohio to escape malarial conditions in the lower Cuyahoga Valley. The first permanent European settler in Cleaveland was Lorenzo Carter, who built a large log cabin on the banks of the Cuyahoga River.

Though not initially apparent — the settlement was adjacent to swampy lowlands and the harsh winters did not encourage settlement — Cleaveland's location ultimately proved providential. It was for that reason that Cleaveland was selected as the seat of Cuyahoga County in 1809, despite protests from nearby rival Newburgh. Cleaveland's location also made it an important supply post for the U.S. during the Battle of Lake Erie in the War of 1812. Locals adopted Commodore Oliver Hazard Perry as a civic hero and erected a monument in his honor decades later. Largely through the efforts of the settlement's first lawyer Alfred Kelley, the village of Cleaveland was incorporated on December 23, 1814. In the municipal first elections on June 5, 1815, Kelley was unanimously elected the first president of the village. He held that position for only a few months, resigning on March 19, 1816.

=== Village to city, 1820–1860 ===
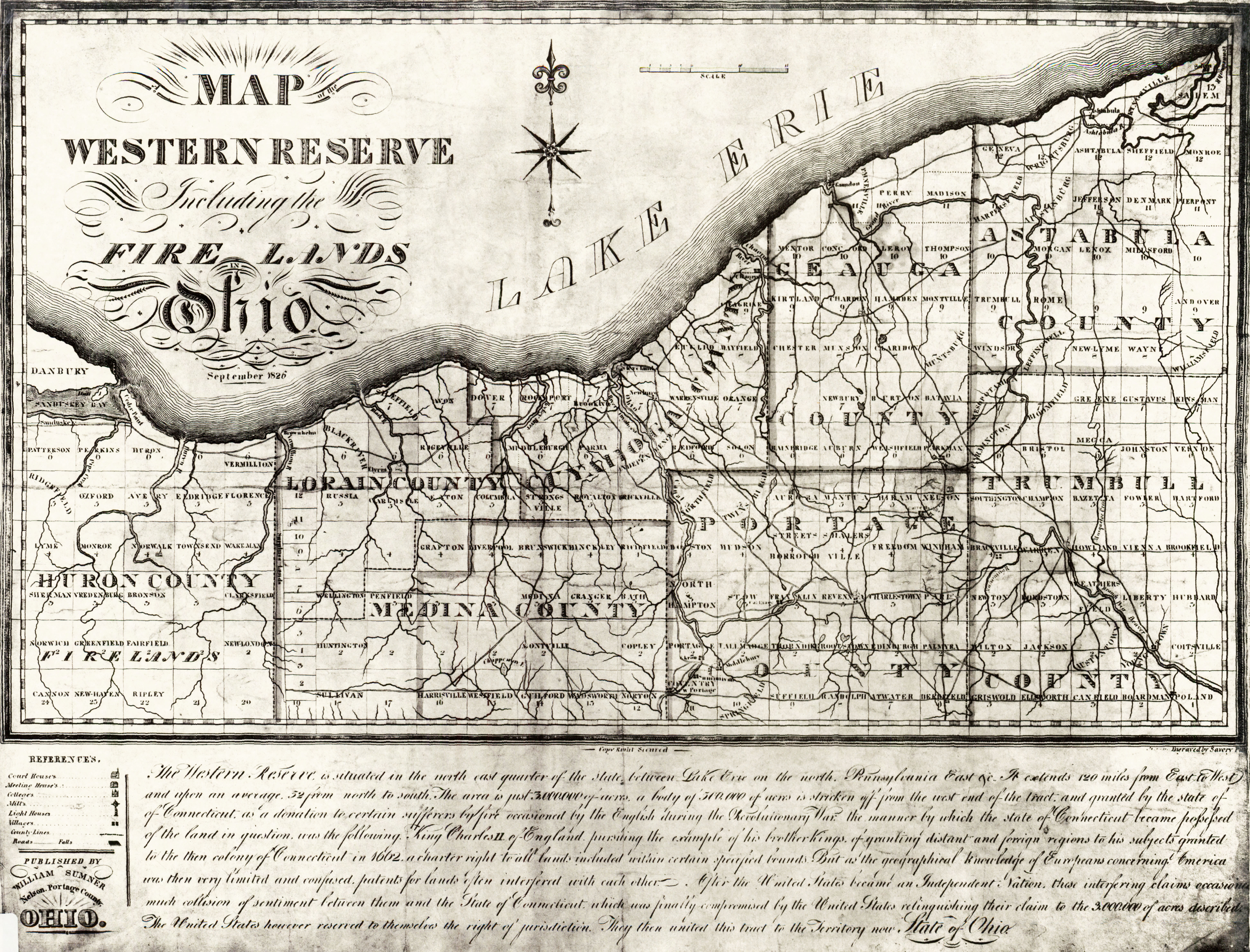
Map of the Connecticut Western Reserve in 1826

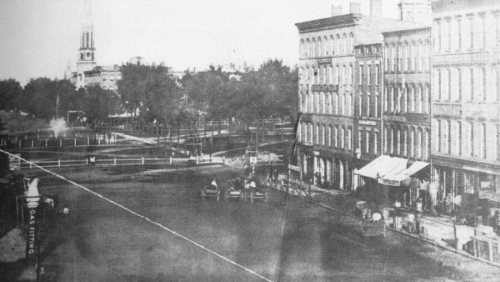
The earliest known photograph of Cleveland's Public Square, 1857

Cleveland began to grow rapidly after the completion of the Ohio and Erie Canal in 1832, turning the village into a key link between the Ohio River and the Great Lakes, particularly once the city railroad links were added. In 1822, a young, charismatic New Hampshire lawyer, John W. Willey, arrived in Cleveland and quickly established himself in the growing village. He became a popular figure in local politics and wrote the Municipal Charter as well as several of the original laws and ordinances. Willey oversaw Cleveland's official incorporation as a city in 1836 and was elected the town's first official mayor for two terms. With James Clark and others, Willey bought a section of the Flats with plans to develop it into Cleveland Centre, a mixed residential and commercial district. Willey then purchased a piece of land from the southeast section of Ohio City across from Columbus Street in Cleveland. Willey named the new territory Willeyville and subsequently built a bridge connecting the two parts, calling it Columbus Street Bridge. The bridge siphoned off commercial traffic to Cleveland before it could reach Ohio City's mercantile district.

These actions aggravated citizens of Ohio City, and brought to the surface a fierce rivalry between the small town and Cleveland. Ohio City citizens rallied for "Two Bridges or None!". In October 1836, they violently sought to stop the use of Cleveland's new bridge by bombing the western end of it. However, the explosion caused little damage. A group of 1,000 Ohio City volunteers began digging deep ditches at both ends of the bridge, making it impossible for horses and wagons to reach the structure. Some citizens were still unsatisfied with this and took to using guns, crowbars, axes, and other weapons to finish off the bridge. They were then met by Willey and a group of armed Cleveland militiamen. A battle ensued on the bridge, with two men seriously wounded before the county sheriff arrived to stop the conflict and make arrests. The confrontation could have escalated into all out war between Cleveland and Ohio City, but was avoided by a court injunction. The two cities eventually made amends, and Ohio City was annexed by Cleveland in 1854.

The Columbus bridge became an important asset for Cleveland, permitting produce to enter the city from the surrounding hinterlands and allowing it to build its mercantile base. This was greatly increased with the coming of the Ohio and Erie Canal which realized the city's potential as a major Great Lakes port. Later, the growing town flourished as a halfway point for iron ore coming from Minnesota across the Great Lakes and for coal and other raw materials coming by rail from the south. It was in this period that Cleveland saw its first significant influx of immigrants, particularly from Ireland and the German states.

=== Civil War, 1861–1865 ===
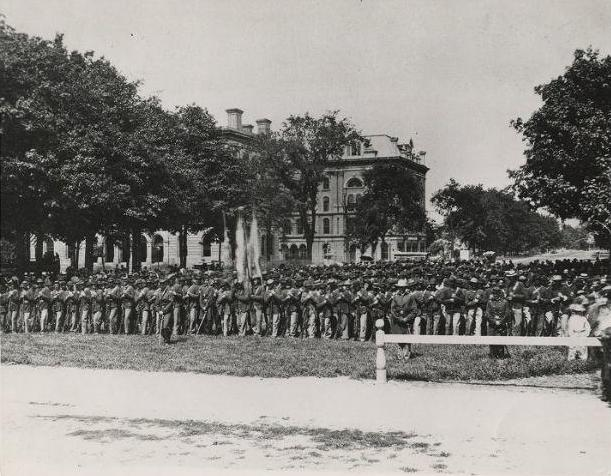
Cleveland veterans of the American Civil War at Public Square, 1865

Strongly influenced by its New England roots, Cleveland was home to a vocal group of abolitionists who viewed slavery as a moral evil. Code-named "Station Hope", the city was a major stop on the Underground Railroad for escaped African American slaves en route to Canada. However, not all Clevelanders opposed slavery outright and views on the slaveholding South varied based on political affiliation. Nevertheless, as Bertram Wyatt-Brown noted, the city's "record of sympathy and help for the black man's plight in America matched, if not exceeded, that of any other metropolitan center in North America, with the exception, perhaps, of Boston and Toronto."

In the 1860 presidential election, Abraham Lincoln won 58% of the vote in 9 of Cleveland's 11 wards. In February 1861, the president-elect visited Cleveland on his way from Illinois to his inauguration in Washington and was greeted by a massive reception. However, as the war loomed closer, the partisan rhetoric of Cleveland newspapers became more and more heated. The pro-Republican Cleveland Herald and Gazette celebrated Lincoln's victory "as one of right over wrong, of Unionists over secession-minded southern Democrats," while another Republican paper, The Cleveland Leader dismissed threats of Southern secession. By contrast, the pro-Democratic Plain Dealer argued that Lincoln's election would mean the imminent secession of the South. When the American Civil War finally erupted in April 1861, Cleveland Republicans and War Democrats decided to temporarily put aside their differences and unite as the Union party in support of the war effort against the Confederacy. However, this uneasy coalition in support of the Union did not go untested.

The Civil War years brought an economic boom to Cleveland. The city was making the transition from a small town into an industrial giant. Local industries manufactured railroad iron, gun carriages, gun carriage axles, and gun powder. In 1863, "22% of all ships built for use on the Great Lakes were built in Cleveland," a figure that jumped to 44% by 1865. By 1865, Cleveland's banks "held $2.25 million in capital and $3.7 million in deposits." When the war ended, the city welcomed home its returning troops by treating them to a meal and welcoming ceremony at Public Square. Decades later, in July 1894, those Clevelanders serving the Union Army would be honored with the opening of the Soldiers' and Sailors' Monument. After Lincoln's assassination in 1865, his casket passed through Cleveland as thousands of onlookers observed the procession.

=== Industrial growth, 1865–1899 ===
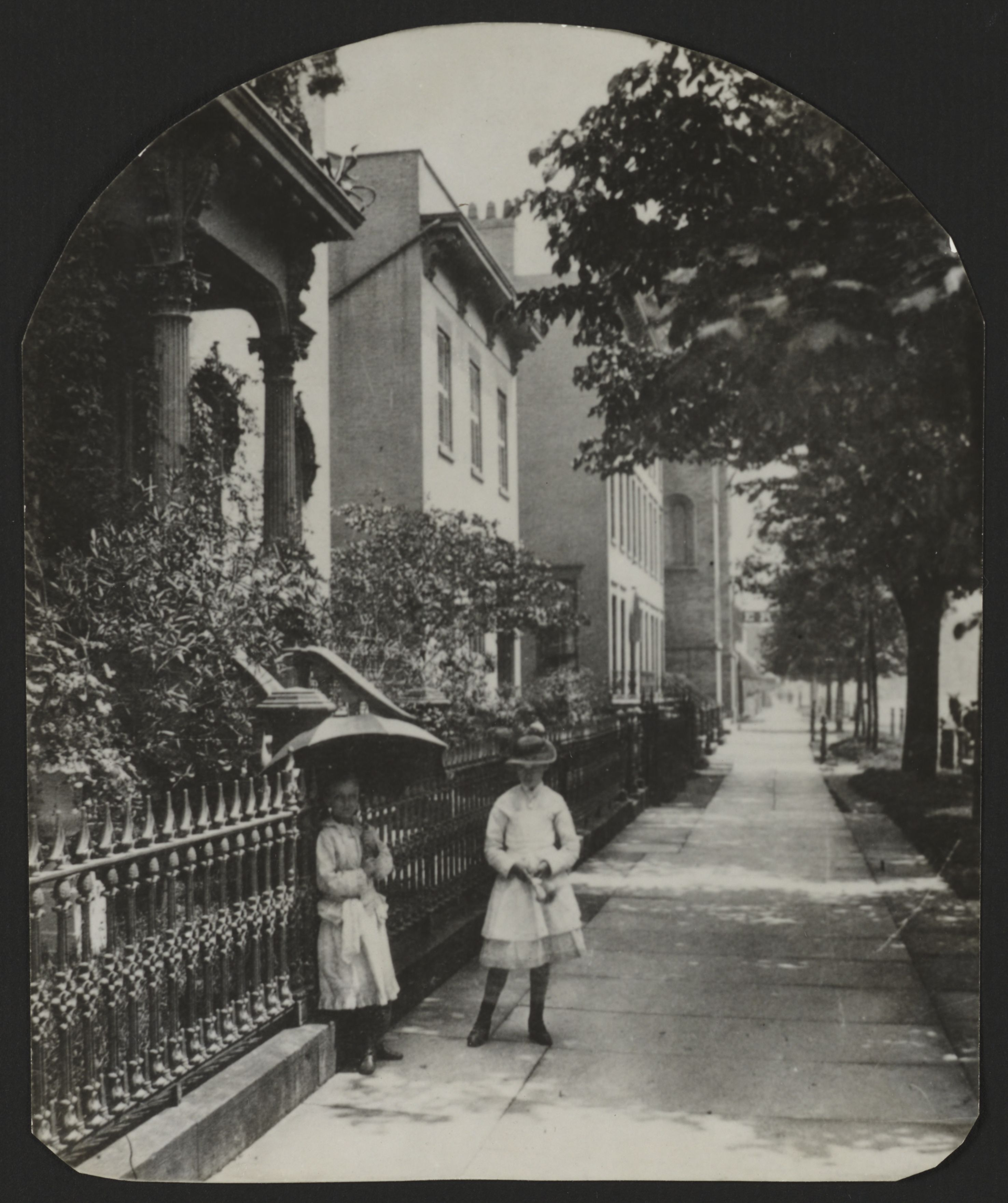
Prospect Avenue, 1875

The Civil War vaulted Cleveland into the first rank of American manufacturing cities and fueled unprecedented growth. It became home to numerous major steel production firms and, in 1883, Samuel Livingston Mather II co-founded Pickands Mather and Company in the city, specializing in shipping and iron mining. Cleveland also became one of the five main oil refining centers in the U.S. In 1870, Standard Oil began as a partnership based in Cleveland, between John D. Rockefeller, William Rockefeller, Henry M. Flagler, and Samuel Andrews. Many mansions were built along the city's more prominent streets, such as the Southworth House along Prospect Avenue, and those on Millionaire's Row, on Euclid Avenue.

Along with the economic boom, Cleveland's immigrant population continued to grow. By 1870, the city's population had shot up to 92,829, more than doubling its 1860 population of 43,417, with a foreign-born population of 42%. In addition to the Irish and the Germans, mass numbers of new immigrants, particularly from Southern and Eastern Europe, came to the city, attracted by the prospect of jobs and the promise of a better future in America. By 1890, the year when the Cleveland Arcade was opened to the public, Cleveland had become the nation's 10th largest city, with a population of 261,353.

Gilded Age urban growth fostered the need for efficient police and fire protection, decent housing, public education, sanitation and health services, transportation, and better roads and streets. Industrial growth was also accompanied by significant strikes and labor unrest, as workers demanded better working conditions. In 1881–86, 70-80% of strikes were successful in improving labor conditions in Cleveland. The Cleveland Streetcar Strike of 1899 was one of the more violent instances of labor unrest in the city during this period.

Politically, the Republicans became the dominant political party in postbellum Cleveland. The main architect of this development was industrialist Mark Hanna, who entered politics when he was elected to the Cleveland Board of Education around 1869 and became a political boss. Hanna was eventually challenged by Republican Robert E. McKisson, who became mayor in 1895 and launched the construction of a new city water and sewer system. Vehemently anti-Hanna, McKisson created a powerful political machine to vie for control of the local Republican party. He padded the payroll with his political cronies, expanded the activities of government, and called for city ownership of all utilities. After serving two terms, he was soundly defeated by an alliance of Democrats and Hanna Republicans.

== 20th century ==
=== The Progressive Era, 1900–1919 ===
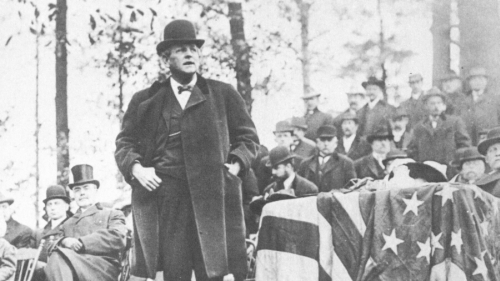
Cleveland mayor Tom L. Johnson addressing an outdoor meeting, 1908

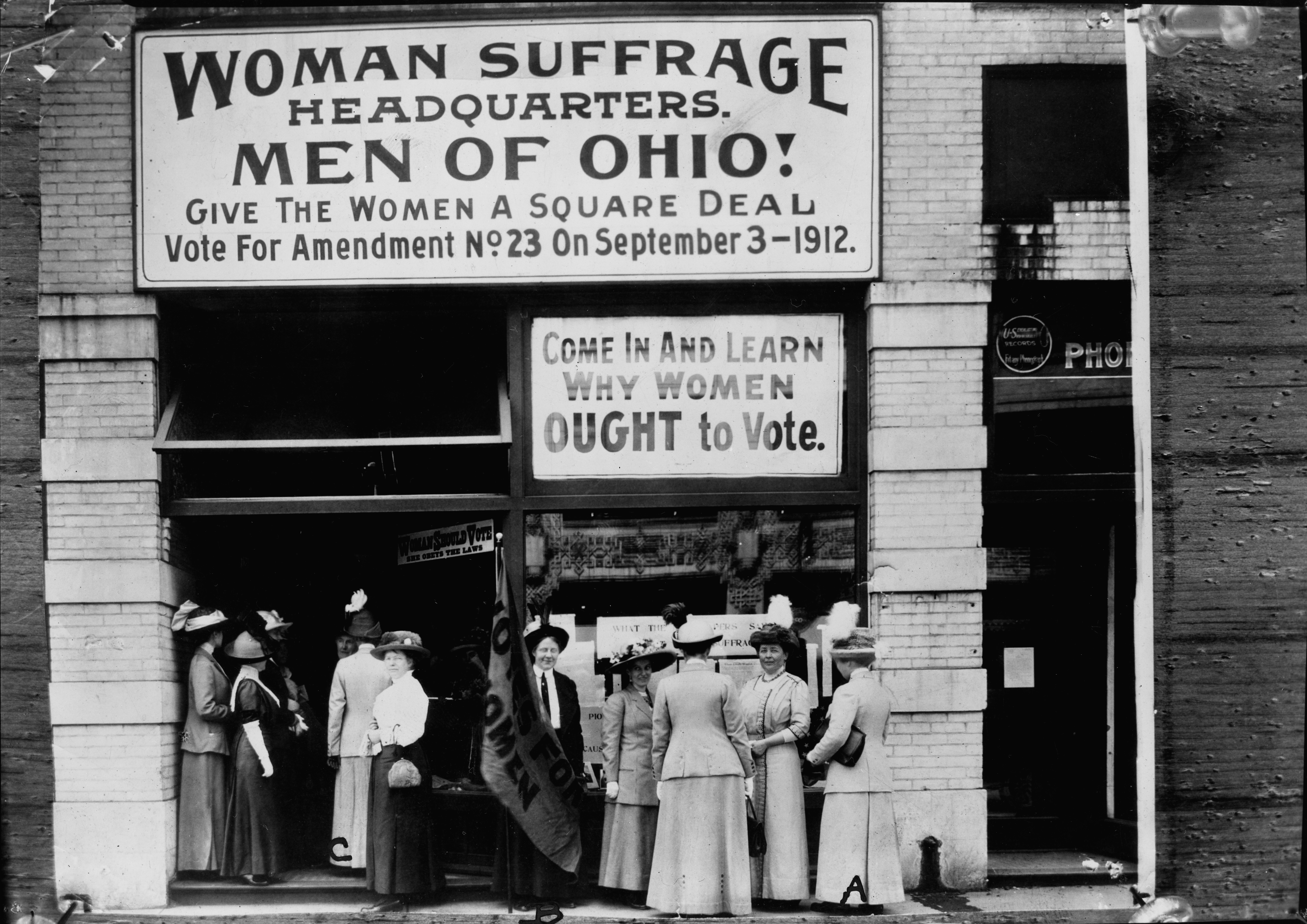
Belle Sherwin and Florence E. Allen at Woman suffrage headquarters, Upper Euclid Avenue, Cleveland, 1912

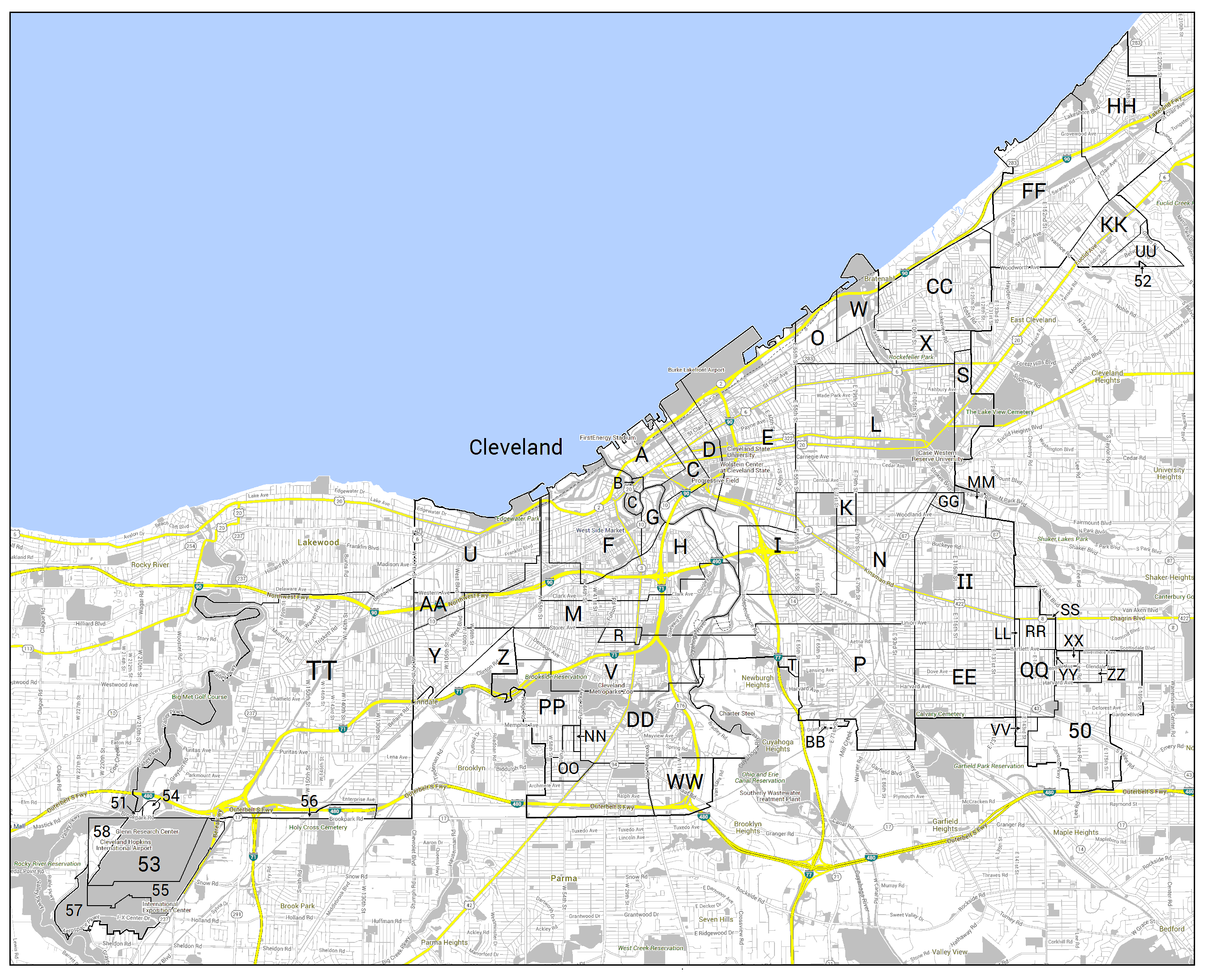
Map of Territorial Changes to the City of Cleveland

Early in the 20th century, Cleveland was a city on the rise and was known as the "Sixth City" due to its position as the sixth largest U.S. city at the time. Its businesses included automotive companies such as Peerless, People's, Jordan, Chandler, and Winton, maker of the first car driven across the U.S. Other manufacturers in Cleveland produced steam-powered cars, which included those by White and Gaeth, and electric cars produced by Baker. The city's population also continued to grow. Alongside new immigrants, African American migrants from the rural South arrived in Cleveland (among other Northeastern and Midwestern cities) as part of the Great Migration for jobs, constitutional rights, and relief from racial discrimination.

However, it was clear that the city's government needed major reform. After a succession of Hanna Republicans and McKisson's corrupt political machine, Cleveland voted for change, putting progressive Democrat Tom L. Johnson into the mayor's office in 1901. Johnson led reforms for "home rule, three-cent fare, and just taxation". He initiated the Group Plan of 1903 as well as the Mall, the earliest and most complete civic-center plan for a major city outside of Washington, D.C. Together with cabinet members Newton D. Baker and Harris R. Cooley, Johnson also worked to professionalize city hall.

Johnson's progressive associate Newton Baker was elected mayor in 1911. An advocate of municipal home rule, Baker helped write the Ohio constitutional amendment of 1912 granting municipalities the right of self-governance. He played a prominent role in Cleveland's first home rule charter, which passed in 1913. In 1913 he went to Washington as Woodrow Wilson's Secretary of War. He subsequently returned to practicing law in Cleveland and became the founder of the law firm Baker, Hostetler & Sidlo (today BakerHostetler).

The spirit of the Progressive Era had a lasting impact on Cleveland. The era of the City Beautiful movement in Cleveland architecture, the period saw wealthy patrons support the establishment of the city's major cultural institutions. The most prominent among them were the Cleveland Museum of Art (CMA), which opened in 1916, and the Cleveland Orchestra, established in 1918. From its formation, the CMA offered admission free to the public "for the benefit of all the people forever."

Baker was succeeded as mayor by Harry L. Davis. Davis established the Mayor's Advisory War Committee, formed in 1917 to assist with aiding the American effort in World War I. After the war ended in 1918, the nation became gripped by the First Red Scare in the aftermath of the Bolshevik Revolution in Russia. The local branch of the Cleveland Socialists, led by Charles Ruthenberg, together with the Industrial Workers of the World (IWW), demanded better working conditions for the largely immigrant and migrant workers. Tensions eventually exploded in the violent Cleveland May Day Riots of 1919, in which socialist and IWW demonstrators clashed with anti-socialists. The home of Mayor Davis was also bombed by the Italian anarchist followers of Luigi Galleani. In response, Davis campaigned for the expulsion of all "Bolsheviks" from America. Faced with the issue of the riots and his own ambitions to become governor of Ohio, Davis resigned in May 1920. He would later serve as a mayor again in 1933.

=== The Roaring Twenties, 1920–1929 ===
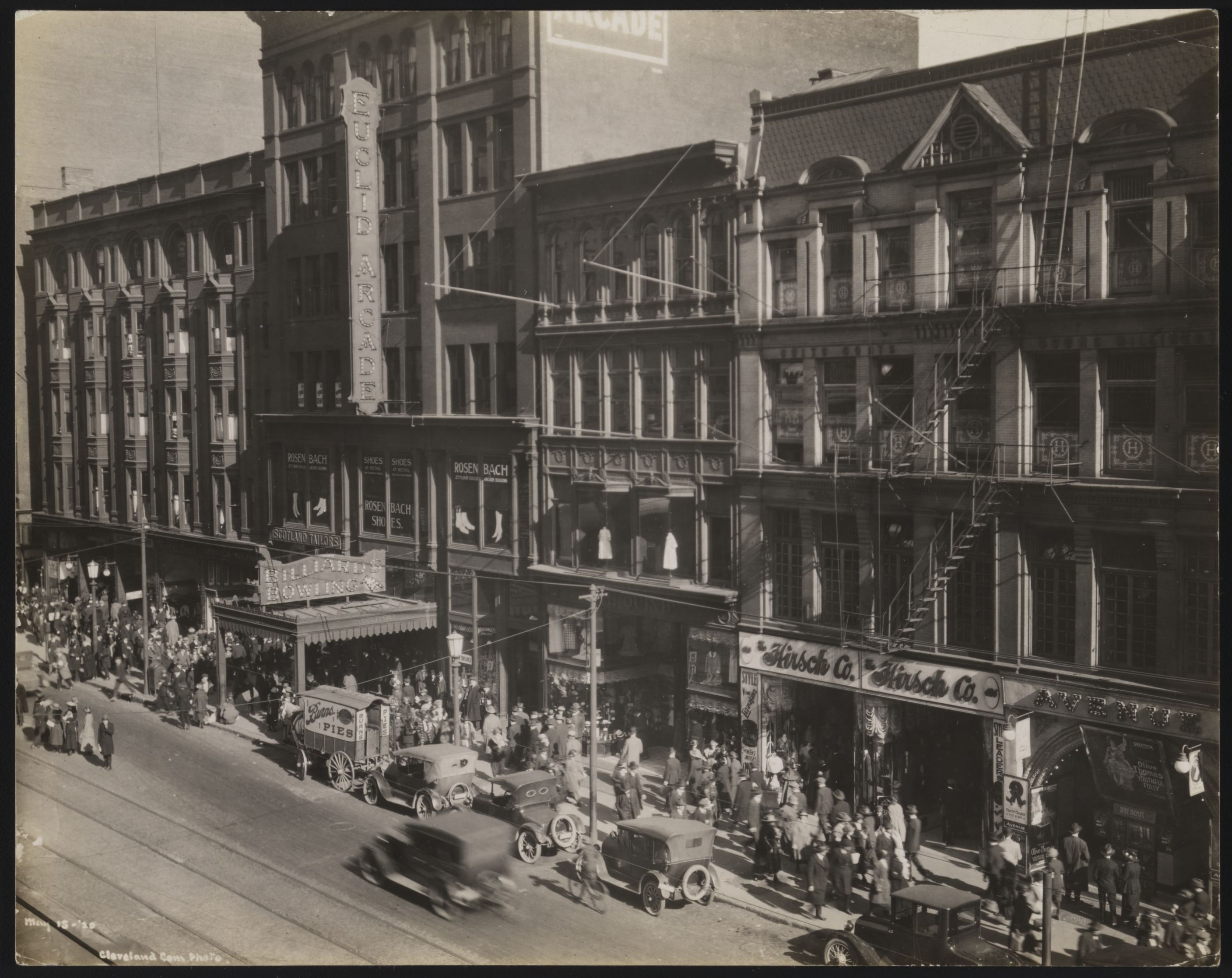
Euclid Avenue in 1920

Aerial footage of Cleveland in 1924

The Roaring Twenties was a prosperous decade for Cleveland. By 1920, the year in which the Cleveland Indians won their first World Series championship, Cleveland had grown into a densely populated metropolis of 796,841 with a foreign-born population of 30%, making it the fifth largest city in the nation. Despite the national immigration restrictions of the 1920s, the city's population continued to grow. In 1923 the speed nut was invented by Cleveland industrialist and inventor Albert Tinnerman. In order to solve the problem of the porcelain on the family company's stoves cracking when panels were screwed tightly together, Albert invented the speed nut. This revolutionized assembly lines in the automobile and airline industries.

Cleveland's iconic Terminal Tower under construction in 1927

The decade also saw the establishment of Cleveland's Playhouse Square and the rise of the risqué Short Vincent entertainment district. The Bal-Masque balls of the avant-garde Kokoon Arts Club scandalized the city. The northward migration of musicians from New Orleans brought jazz to Cleveland; new jazz talent also rose from Cleveland Central High School. The era of the flapper marked the beginning of the golden age in Downtown Cleveland retail, centered on major department stores Higbee's, Bailey's, the May Company, Taylor's, Halle's, and Sterling Lindner Davis, which collectively represented one of the largest and most fashionable shopping districts in the country, often compared to New York's Fifth Avenue. In 1929, the city hosted the first of many National Air Races, and Amelia Earhart flew to the city from Santa Monica, California in the Women's Air Derby (nicknamed the "Powder Puff Derby" by Will Rogers).

In politics, the city began a brief experiment with a council–manager government system in 1924. William R. Hopkins, who became the first city manager, oversaw the development of parks, the Cleveland Municipal Airport (later renamed Hopkins International Airport), and improved welfare services. In 1923, the building of the Federal Reserve Bank of Cleveland on East 6th Street and Superior Avenue was opened, and in 1925, the main building of the Cleveland Public Library on Superior was opened under the supervision of head librarian Linda Eastman, the first woman ever to lead a major library system in the world. Both buildings were designed by the Cleveland architectural firm Walker and Weeks. In 1926, the Van Sweringen brothers, who had previously worked to improve Cleveland's trolley and rapid program, began construction of the Terminal Tower skyscraper in 1926 and, by the time it was dedicated in 1930, Cleveland had a population of over 900,000. Until 1967, the tower was the tallest building in the world outside of New York.

Before Prohibition, Cleveland had been a major center of the temperance movement, with the Woman's Christian Temperance Union having been founded there. The Eighteenth Amendment prohibiting the sale and manufacturing of alcohol first took effect in Cleveland on May 27, 1919. However, it was not well-enforced in the city. Cleveland alcohol stocks declined when the Prohibition Bureau sent an administrator and federal agents as the amendment and the Volstead Act became law in January 1920. With prohibition, Cleveland, like other major American cities saw the rise of organized crime. Little Italy's Mayfield Road Mob was notorious for smuggling bootleg alcohol out of Canada to Cleveland. The mob's members included Joe Lonardo, Nathan Weisenburg, the seven Porello brothers (four of whom were killed), Moses Donley, Paul Hackett, and J.J. Schleimer. These names and Milano, Furgus, and O'Boyle held the same connotation as Al Capone in Chicago. Speakeasies began appearing all over the city. An anti-Prohibition group found 2,545 such locations throughout Cleveland.

=== The Great Depression, 1929–1939 ===
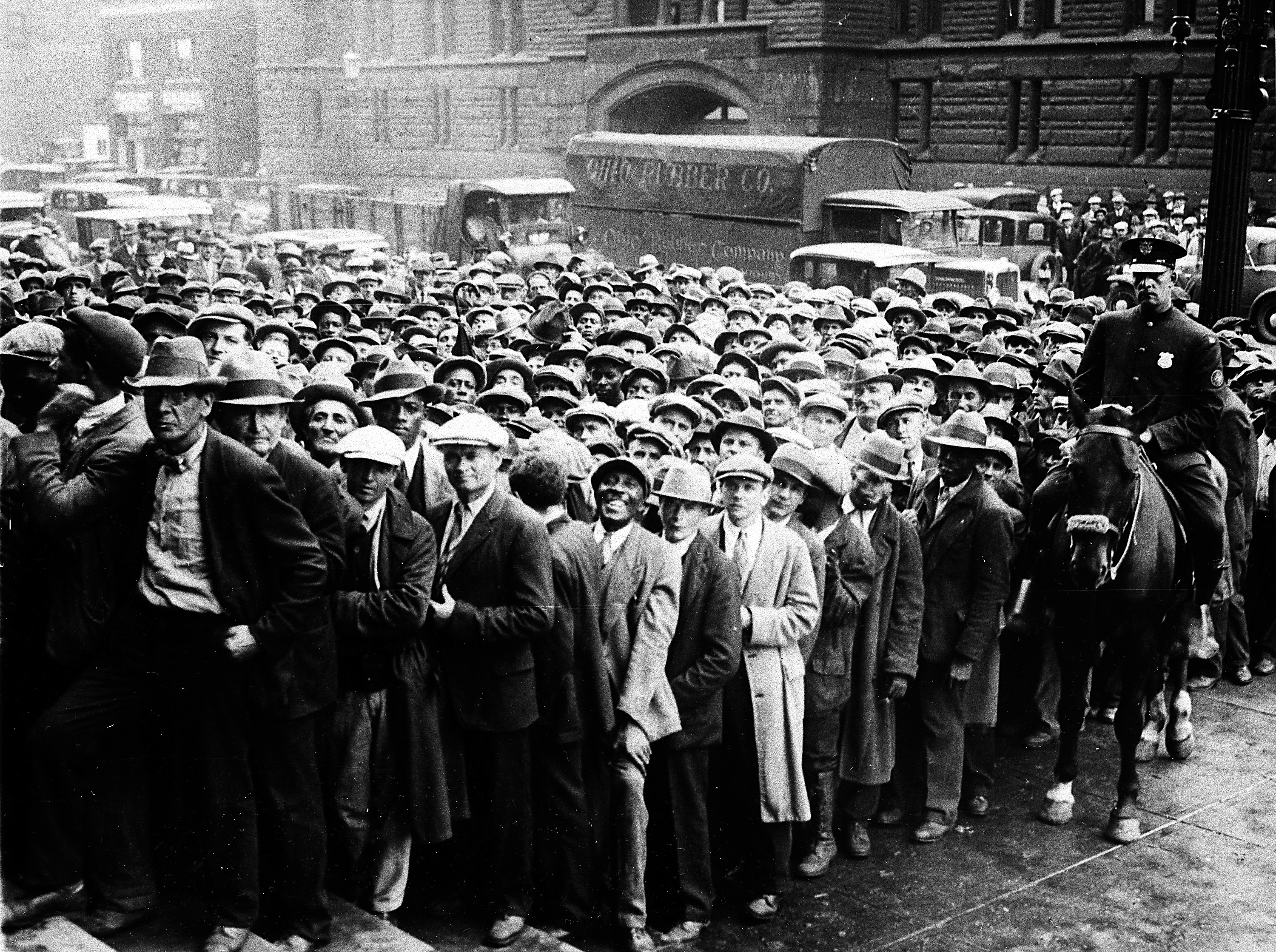
Unemployed Clevelanders seeking jobs at Cleveland City Hall, 1930

On October 24, 1929, the stock market crashed, plunging the entire nation into the Great Depression. The crash hit Cleveland hard, with industrialist Cyrus Eaton once stating that the city was "hurt more by the Depression than any other city in the United States." By 1933, approximately fifty percent of Cleveland's industrial workers were left unemployed by the Depression.

Anti-Prohibition sentiment continued to grow. Tired of gang wars in Cleveland and Chicago, Fred G. Clark founded an anti-gang, anti-Prohibition group known as the Crusaders. Cleveland became their national headquarters, and by 1932 the Crusaders claimed one million members. Formed in Chicago, the Women's Organization for National Prohibition Reform was another group that rose to prominence during this period. When Franklin D. Roosevelt became president, Prohibition appeared to be near an end. Together, the Crusaders, the Association Against the Prohibition Amendment, and the Women's Organization for National Prohibition Reform formed the Ohio Repeal Council, and Prohibition was finally repealed in Cleveland on December 23, 1933.

Politically, the city abolished the city manager system under Daniel E. Morgan and returned to the mayor–council (strong mayor) system. After a brief stint in office by Democratic Mayor Ray T. Miller, who would later serve as the powerful chairman of the Cuyahoga County Democratic Party, Harry L. Davis, who had previously served as mayor, returned. However, Davis exhibited increasing incompetence in office and the city became a haven for criminal activity. The police department was corrupt, prostitution and illegal gambling were rampant, and organized crime was still abundant.

In the next election, Harold H. Burton became the city's new mayor. Burton, a lawyer from New England and future Supreme Court Associate Justice, sought to get Cleveland back on its feet. He accomplished this with the help of his newly appointed Safety Director, Eliot Ness, who previously served as Chief Investigator of the Prohibition Bureau for Chicago and Ohio, and played an important role in putting Al Capone behind bars. Ness made a name for himself in Cleveland by first and foremost cleaning up the city's police department. As the head of the city's Safety Directorate, Ness introduced a new police district system in Cleveland, fired corrupt and incompetent officers from the force, and replaced them with talented rookies and unrecognized veterans. During Ness's tenure as Safety Director, crime dropped significantly in the city. He also improved traffic safety and orchestrated raids on such notorious gambling spots as the Harvard Club. However, Ness's tenure also coincided with a notorious string of grisly slayings that remain unsolved.

A center of union activity, the city saw significant labor struggles in this period, including strikes by workers against Fisher Body in 1936 and against Republic Steel in 1937. The city was also aided by major federal works projects sponsored by President Roosevelt's New Deal. In commemoration of the centennial of Cleveland's incorporation as a city, the Great Lakes Exposition debuted in June 1936 at the city's North Coast Harbor, along the Lake Erie shore north of downtown. Conceived by Cleveland's business leaders as a way to revitalize the city during the Depression, it drew four million visitors in its first season, and seven million by the end of its second and final season in September 1937.

=== World War II and postwar, 1940–1962 ===
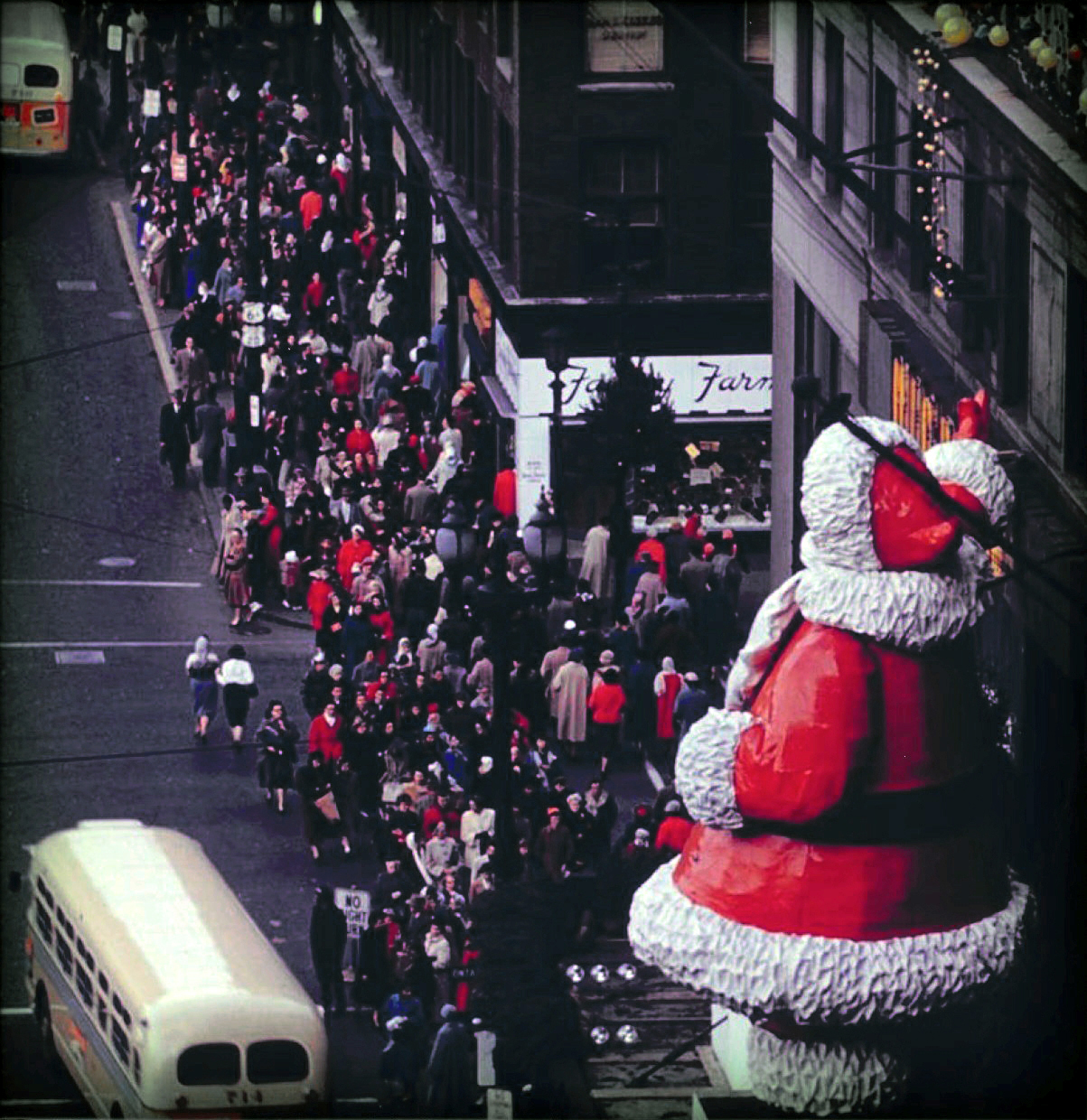
Christmas shoppers on Euclid Ave. and Ontario St. in the 1950s

On December 7, 1941, Imperial Japan attacked Pearl Harbor and declared war on the United States. One of the victims of the attack was a Cleveland native, Rear Admiral Isaac C. Kidd. The attack signaled America's entry into World War II. A major hub of the "Arsenal of Democracy", Cleveland under Democratic Mayor Frank Lausche contributed massively to the U.S. war effort as the fifth largest manufacturing center in the nation. Cleveland's first mayor of Eastern European descent, Lausche also oversaw the establishment of the Cleveland Transit System, the predecessor to the Greater Cleveland Regional Transit Authority.

After the war, Cleveland initially experienced an economic boom, and businesses declared the city to be the "best location in the nation." In 1949, the city was named an All-America City for the first time and, in 1950, its population reached 914,808. In sports, the Indians won the 1948 World Series, the hockey team, the Barons, became champions of the American Hockey League, and the Browns dominated professional football in the 1950s. As a result, along with track and boxing champions produced, Cleveland was declared the "City of Champions" in sports at this time. The 1950s also saw the rising popularity of a new music genre that local WJW (AM) disc jockey Alan Freed dubbed "rock and roll."

After Lausche left office to become the Governor of Ohio, Democrat Thomas A. Burke won a first term as mayor in 1945. He was re-elected by voters in the 1947 mayoral election against Republican challenger Eliot Ness, who left Cleveland during the war to become director of the Division of Social Protection of the Federal Security Agency. Burke's greatest achievement as mayor was his large capital-improvement program that included the establishment of the Cleveland Burke Lakefront Airport, but he also successfully managed race relations in the city. In 1954, Burke was succeeded by Democrat Anthony J. Celebrezze, Cleveland's first Italian American mayor. Celebrezze oversaw the completion of Cleveland's Rapid Transit and expansion of the freeway system. He also launched the Erieview Urban Renewal Plan. Celebrezze was so popular with Cleveland voters that he served an unprecedented five terms before becoming the United States Secretary of Health, Education, and Welfare under Presidents John F. Kennedy and Lyndon B. Johnson.

=== Turbulent era, 1962–1979 ===
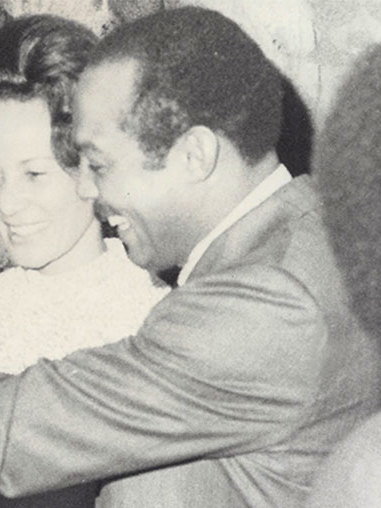
Cleveland Mayor Carl B. Stokes, the first African American mayor of a major U.S. city

Ralph S. Locher became Celebrezze's successor in 1962. Although Locher made some strides, such as expanding Hopkins Airport, his tenure was strained by new challenges facing the city. By the 1960s, Cleveland's economy began to slow down, and residents increasingly sought new housing in the suburbs, reflecting the national trends of suburbanization following federally subsidized highways. Industrial restructuring, particularly in the steel and automotive industries, resulted in the loss of numerous jobs in Cleveland and the region, and the city suffered economically. Housing discrimination and redlining against African Americans led to racial tension in Cleveland and numerous other Northern U.S. cities. In Cleveland, this tension exploded in the Hough Riots of July 1966. Locher was becoming less and less popular and lost the 1967 mayoral primary to charismatic Democrat Carl B. Stokes. Stokes went on to face Republican Seth Taft and won the 1967 general mayoral election, becoming the first African American mayor of a major U.S. city, attracting national attention.

As mayor, Stokes began initiating reforms to boost the city's economy and aid its poverty-stricken areas. He first succeeded in convincing the Department of Housing and Urban Development to release urban renewal funds for Cleveland that had been frozen under Locher's tenure. He also persuaded City Council to pass the Equal Employment Opportunity Ordinance and to increase the city's income tax from .5% to 1%. It was also Stokes who led the effort to restore Cleveland's Cuyahoga River in the aftermath of the river fire of June 1969 that brought national attention to the issue of industrial pollution in Cleveland. The river fire was to be the last in the city's history, and it became a catalyst in the rise of the American environmental movement. Since that time, through efforts begun by the Stokes administration and the Ohio Environmental Protection Agency (OEPA), the river has been extensively cleaned-up.

In 1968, Stokes launched Cleveland: Now!, a program aimed at rehabilitating the city's poorer neighborhoods. This program was initially highly successful. However, after the 1968 Glenville Shootout, it was discovered that Fred "Ahmed" Evans and his black militant group, who had initiated the chaos, indirectly received money from Cleveland: Now!, putting the mayor in a difficult position. Although Stokes secured re-election in 1969, the fallout from the incident as well as continued conflicts with City Council led him to decline from seeking a third term in 1971.

Stokes was succeeded by Ralph J. Perk, an ethnic Czech American and the first Republican to serve as mayor of Cleveland since the 1940s. Perk benefited from good connections with President Richard Nixon, allowing Cleveland to obtain federal funds to aid neighborhoods and to help crack down on city crime in the era of Irish American mobster Danny Greene. It was Perk who proposed merging Cleveland's public transit system with those of neighboring suburbs, thus forming the Greater Cleveland Regional Transit Authority. He also greatly expanded Cleveland's international ties by initiating several sister city partnerships. However, Perk was also known for his political gaffes, such as an incident in which his hair caught on fire, and another when his wife, Lucille, famously refused a dinner invitation from Pat Nixon for her "bowling night." Additionally, the city continued to experience population loss from deindustrialization and forced-busing of Cleveland Public Schools ordered by United States District Judge Frank J. Battisti. Between 1970 and 1973, the city lost 9.6 percent of its population, and by 1980 it had lost its position as one of the top 10 largest cities in the U.S.

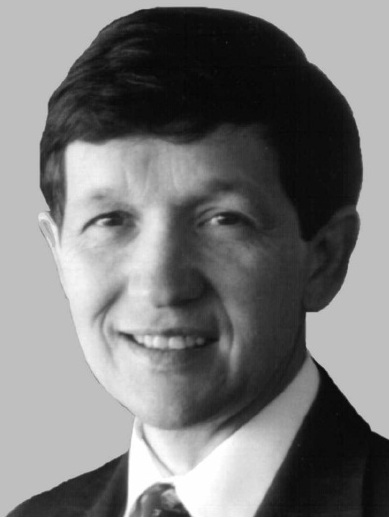
Cleveland Mayor and future Ohio Congressman Dennis Kucinich

In 1977, Perk lost the nonpartisan mayoral primary. Populist Democrat Dennis J. Kucinich went on to win both the primary and the general election. Kucinich was 31 when he assumed office, becoming the youngest mayor of a major U.S. city. Kucinich's tenure as mayor began with one of the worst blizzards in Cleveland history on January 26, 1978, with winds up to 100 miles an hour. In March, he suspended his newly appointed police chief, Richard D. Hongisto in a feud that later erupted into a heated conflict between the two, ending with Hongisto being fired on live local television. This move, combined with conflicts with City Council President George L. Forbes, prompted a successful recall drive against Kucinich with petitions of some 50,000 signatures, leading to the first recall election in the city's history. Kucinich was nearly ousted from his position, but narrowly won with 236 votes.

Part of Kucinich's promise to voters was to cancel the sale of the publicly owned electric company, Cleveland Municipal Light (Muny Light), to the Cleveland Electric Illuminating Company (CEI), a private electric company. The sale was initiated by Perk, but Kucinich cancelled it when he entered office. In response, CEI went to a U.S. federal court to demand $14 million in damages from Muny for purchasing electricity and to secure an order to attach city equipment. Kucinich attempted to pay the bill by cutting city spending. However, the Cleveland Trust Company and five other Cleveland banks told the mayor that they would agree to renew the city's credit on $14 million of loans taken out by the prior administration only if he would sell Muny. As it happened, Kucinich did not sell and at midnight on December 15, 1978, Cleveland became the first major American city since the Great Depression to default on its financial obligations. By this time, voters had grown tired of the turbulent Kucinich years. In Cleveland's 1979 mayoral election, the mayor was defeated by Republican George V. Voinovich.

== Late 20th and early 21st centuries ==
=== Comeback and stagnation, 1980–2005 ===
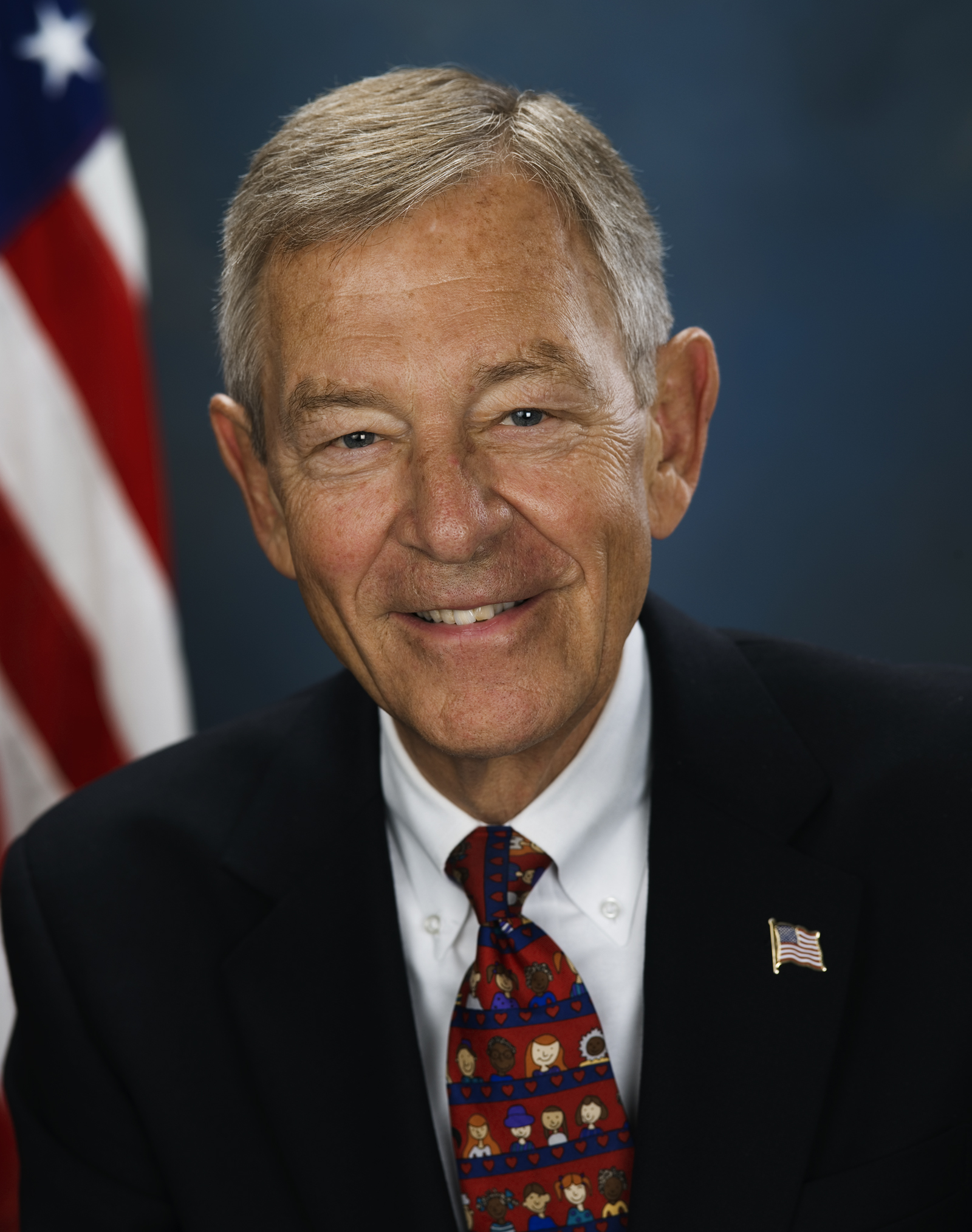
Cleveland Mayor and Ohio Governor and Senator George Voinovich

By the beginning of the 1980s, several factors, including changes in international free trade policies, inflation, and the Savings and Loans Crisis, contributed to the recession that severely affected cities like Cleveland. While unemployment during the period peaked in 1983, Cleveland's rate of 13.8% was higher than the national average due to the closure of several steel production centers. It was in these conditions, in addition to Cleveland's default, that the city began a gradual economic recovery under Mayor Voinovich. While maintaining the city's stance on Muny Light, Voinovich also oversaw the construction of the Key Tower and 200 Public Square skyscrapers, as well as the development of the Gateway Sports and Entertainment Complex—consisting of Progressive Field and Rocket Arena—and the North Coast Harbor, including the Rock and Roll Hall of Fame, Huntington Bank Field, and the Great Lakes Science Center. By 1987, Cleveland was not only out of default but was named an All-America City for a second, third, and fourth time. After his mayoralty, Voinovich then made a successful run for the governorship of Ohio.

Voinovich's successor was Democrat Michael R. White, who continued his predecessor's development plans in the downtown area near the Gateway complex—consisting of Jacobs Field and Gund Arena—and near the Rock and Roll Hall of Fame and Cleveland Browns Stadium. After serving three times, he declined from running for a fourth term in 2001 and retired to an alpaca farm near Newcomerstown, Ohio. Four years later, a federal investigation revealed that, despite the strides that White made in office, he may have accepted bribes from one of his associates, Nate Gray, in exchange for construction and parking contracts. However, no charges were made against the former mayor.

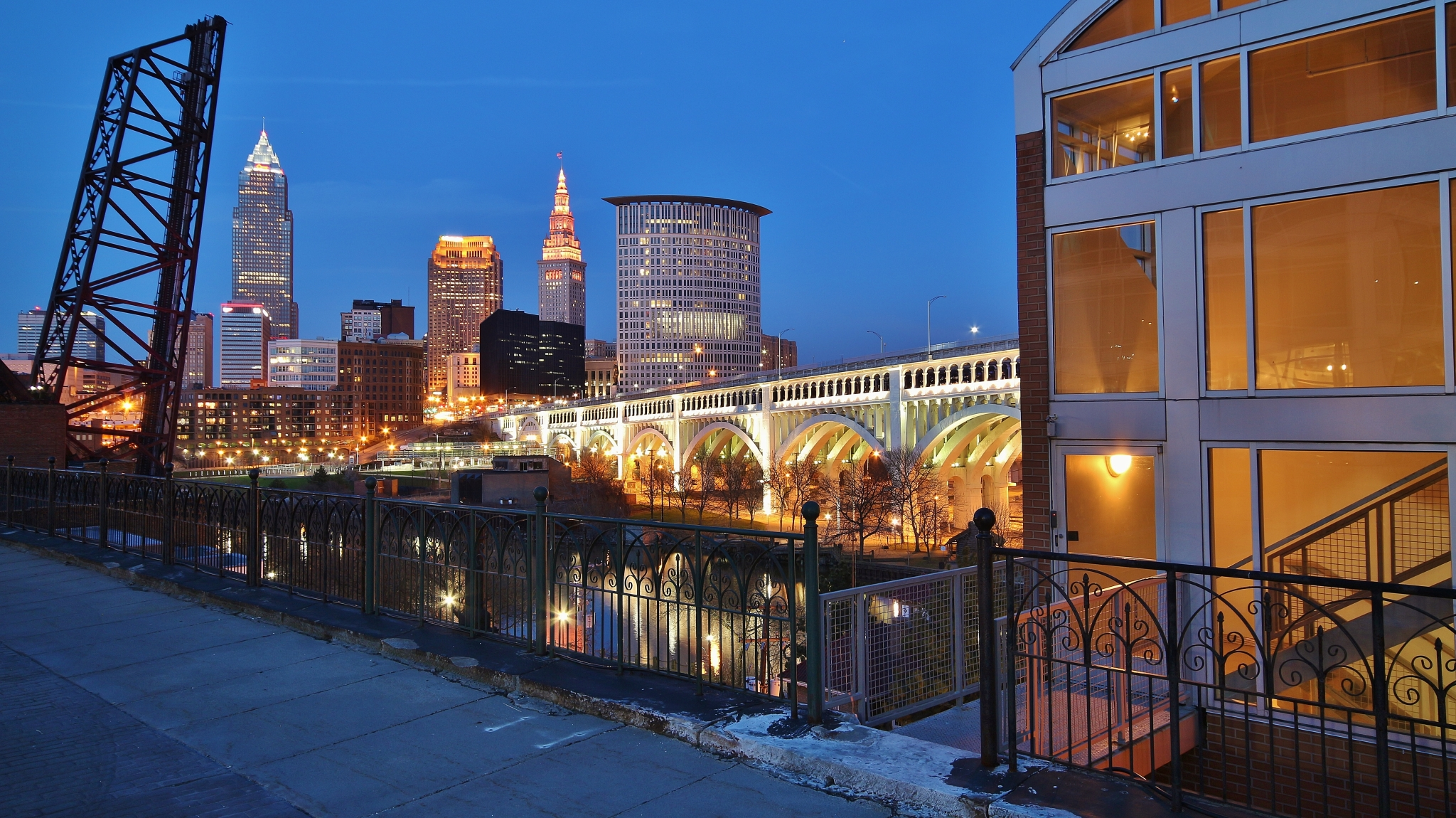
Downtown Cleveland from the Superior Viaduct at night

In 2002, White was succeeded by Jane L. Campbell, the city's first female mayor. Under the Campbell administration, the economic and civic recovery begun under former Mayor Voinovich appeared to stagnate. The national decline of the steel and auto industries continued to hurt the region's economy, the city's public school system languished in the state's "academic emergency" rating, and tight budgets forced layoffs of city employees and cuts in public services. Still, several city neighborhoods attracted investment for revitalization, including Downtown, Tremont, Ohio City, Detroit-Shoreway, and parts of Hough. In the 2005 mayoral election, Campbell lost to City Council president, Frank G. Jackson. Jackson received 55% of the vote while Campbell secured 45% and assumed office as the city's 57th mayor on January 1, 2006.

=== Continued evolution, 2006–Present ===
At the beginning of Jackson's mayoralty, the city faced continued challenges, including efforts to retain the city's residency laws, the impact of the Great Recession on city neighborhoods, and a federal corruption investigation into Cuyahoga County officials. However, by the turn of the 21st century, Cleveland succeeded in developing a more diversified economy and gained a national reputation as a center for healthcare and the arts. Additionally, it has become a national leader in environmental protection, with its successful cleanup of the Cuyahoga River. The city's downtown and several neighborhoods have experienced significant population growth since 2010. In 2018, the population of Cleveland began to flatten after decades of decline. This trend has been accompanied by major victories in sports, most prominently the victory of the Cleveland Cavaliers in the 2016 NBA Finals, the first major professional sports championship won by a Cleveland team since 1964.

Nevertheless, challenges still remain for the city, with economic development of neighborhoods, improvement of city schools, and continued efforts to tackle poverty and urban blight being top municipal priorities. In June 2020, Cleveland City Council became the second local government in the US to issue a declaration stating that racism constitutes a public health emergency. A new mayor, Justin Bibb, was elected in 2021.

== Chronology of Cleveland inventions and firsts ==
- 1863 – Free home delivery of mail - Joseph W. Briggs
- 1879 – Electric lighting of public streets - Charles F. Brush
- 1880 – Standardized formula paints - Sherwin-Williams Co.
- 1890 – Indoor shopping center (The Arcade)
- 1896 – X-ray machine and whole-body scanner – Dayton C. Miller (Case School of Applied Science); X-Ray photograph in the U.S. - Dudley Wick (his hand)
- 1898 – Automobile sale in the U.S. - Alexander Winton
- 1899 – Wound-rubber core golf ball - Haskell Coburn
- 1900 – Automobile club
- 1901 – Automobile steering wheel - Alexander Winton
- 1905 – Blood transfusion - Dr. George W. Crile, Sr.
- 1910 – Automobile shock absorbers - C. H. Foster
- 1914 – Electric traffic signal - Euclid Ave. & East 105th St.
- 1915 – Submachine gun
- 1916 – Gas mask successfully demonstrated at Cleveland Waterworks explosion - Garrett A. Morgan
- 1920 – Unassisted triple play in a World Series Baseball Game
- 1921 – Automobile windshield wiper - Frederick G. and William M. Folberth
- 1927 – Municipal airport (Cleveland Hopkins International) and air traffic control tower
- 1928 – Frosted light bulbs - Marvin Pipkin
- 1929 – Airplane automatic pilot (tested)
- 1936 – Health museum
- 1951 – Rock and Roll Music (public recognition and coinage of the term) - Alan Freed
- 1952 – Successful Siamese twin separation
- 1967 – Elected the first African American mayor of a major U.S. city - Carl B. Stokes; Coronary artery bypass - Dr. René Favaloro - Cleveland Clinic
- 1968 – Rapid transit rail service from airport to downtown

== See also ==
- American urban history
- Timeline of Cleveland
- History of Cleveland Clinic
- History of the Cleveland Browns
- History of the Cleveland Cavaliers
- History of the Cleveland Guardians
- History of Ohio
