= Electoral history of Dennis Kucinich =

Overview of Dennis Kucinich's electoral history

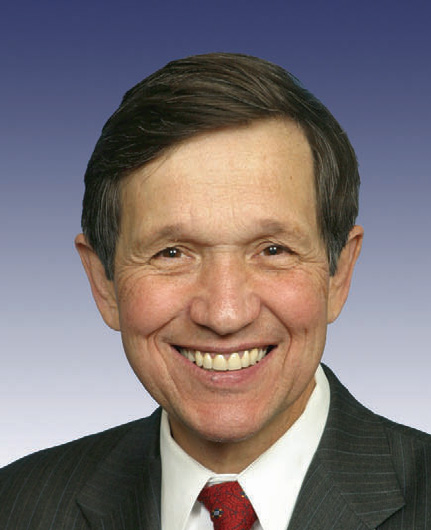
Representative Dennis Kucinich (D-OH)

Electoral history of Dennis Kucinich, United States Representative from Ohio's 10th district (1997–2013), 53rd Mayor of Cleveland (1977–1979) and a candidate for Democratic presidential nomination in 2004 and 2008

== U.S. House of Representatives (1972–1974) ==
Ohio's 23rd congressional district, 1972
William Edwin Minshall, Jr., Republican (incumbent) – 98,594 (49.39%)
Dennis Kucinich, Democrat – 94,366 (47.27%)
John O'Neill, Socialist Labor Party of America – 3,615 (1.81%)
Frederick D. Lyon, American Independent Party – 2,976 (1.49%)
Write-in candidates – 82 (0.04%)

Ohio's 23rd congressional district, 1974
Ronald M. Mottl, Democrat – 53,338 (34.76%)
George Mastics, Republican – 46,810 (30.50%)
Dennis Kucinich, independent – 45,186 (29.45%)
Hugh J. Gallagher, independent – 3,461 (2.26%)
Bohdan Futey, independent – 2,655 (1.73%)
Arthur Cain, independent – 2,005 (1.31%)

== Mayor of Cleveland (1976–1979) ==
Cleveland mayoral election, 1977
Dennis Kucinich – 93,047 (50.81%)
Ed Feighan – 90,074 (49.19%)

Cleveland mayoral recall election, 1978
Against recall – 60,250 (50.10%)
For recall – 60,014 (49.90%)

Cleveland mayoral election, 1979
George Voinovich – 94,541 (56.18%)
Dennis Kucinich (incumbent) – 73,755 (43.83%)

== Ohio Secretary of State (1982) ==
Ohio Secretary of State, 1982 (Democratic primary)
Sherrod Brown – 304,952 (33.77%)
Dennis Kucinich – 246,618 (27.31%)
Anthony O. Calabrese, Jr. – 214,901 (23.80%)
Francis E. Gaul – 136,568 (15.12%)

== U.S. House of Representatives (1988–2002) ==
Ohio's 20th congressional district, 1988 (Democratic primary)
Mary Rose Oakar (incumbent) – 64,417 (76.74%)
Dennis Kucinich – 19,530 (23.27%)

Ohio's 19th congressional district, 1992 (Democratic primary)
Eric D. Fingerhut – 20,929 (24.25%)
Tim McCormack – 16,053 (18.60%)
Dennis Kucinich – 15,453 (17.91%)
Frank J. Valenta – 14,254 (16.52%)
Thomas J. Coyne Jr. – 11,258 (13.05%)
Kathleen Cotter – 4,407 (5.11%)
Tom Milkovich – 1,974 (2.29%)
Jackie Hrnyak – 1,011 (1.17%)
Joan C. Durbak – 957 (1.11%)

Ohio's 10th congressional district, 1996 (Democratic primary)
Dennis Kucinich – 37,895 (77.22%)
Edward Boyle – 9,221 (18.79%)
Donald B. Slusher – 1,253 (2.55%)
C. River Smith – 703 (1.43%)

Ohio's 10th congressional district, 1996
Dennis Kucinich, Democrat – 110,723 (49.06%)
Martin Hoke, Republican (incumbent) – 104,546 (46.32%)
Robert B. Iverson, Natural Law Party – 10,415 (4.62%)
Write-in candidates – 12 (0.01%)

Ohio's 10th congressional district, 1998
Dennis Kucinich, Democrat (incumbent) – 110,552 (66.77%)
Joe Slovenec, Republican – 55,015 (33.23%)

Ohio's 10th congressional district, 2000
Dennis Kucinich, Democrat (incumbent) – 167,093 (75.00%)
Bill Smith, Republican – 48,940 (21.97%)
Ron Petrie, Libertarian Party – 6,761 (3.04%)

Ohio's 10th congressional district, 2002
Dennis Kucinich, Democrat (incumbent) – 129,997 (74.06%)
Jon Heben, Republican – 41,778 (23.80%)
Judy Locy, independent – 3,761 (2.14%)

== U.S. presidential election, 2004 ==
Minnesota Independence Party presidential caucus, 2004

John Edwards – 335 (41.10%)
John Kerry – 149 (18.28%)
George W. Bush (incumbent) – 94 (11.53%)
Ralph Nader – 78 (9.57%)
None of the above – 66 (8.10%)
Dennis Kucinich – 40 (4.91%)
Lorna Salzman – 9 (1.10%)
John McCain – 9 (1.10%)
Al Sharpton – 5 (0.61%)
David Cobb – 4 (0.49%)
Wesley Clark – 4 (0.49%)
Joe Lieberman – 4 (0.49%)
Howard Dean – 3 (0.37%)
Jesse Ventura – 3 (0.37%)
Gary Nolan – 2 (0.25%)
Tim Penny – 2 (0.25%)
Kent Mesplay – 1 (0.12%)
John Bayard Anderson – 1 (0.12%)
Charles Barkley – 1 (0.12%)
Dean Barkley – 1 (0.12%)
Bill Bradley – 1 (0.12%)
Rudy Giuliani – 1 (0.12%)
Mickey Mouse – 1 (0.12%)
Theodore Roosevelt – 1 (0.12%)

2004 Democratic presidential primaries

John Kerry – 9,930,497 (60.98%)
John Edwards – 3,162,337 (19.42%)
Howard Dean – 903,460 (5.55%)
Dennis Kucinich – 620,242 (3.81%)
Wesley Clark – 547,369 (3.36%)
Al Sharpton – 380,865 (2.34%)
Joe Lieberman – 280,940 (1.73%)
Uncommitted delegates – 157,953 (0.97%)
Lyndon LaRouche – 103,731 (0.64%)
Carol Moseley Braun – 98,469 (0.61%)
Dick Gephardt – 63,902 (0.39%)
Scattering – 12,525 (0.08%)

2004 Green National Convention (presidential tally)

David Cobb – 408 (36.20%)
No nominee – 308 (27.33%)
Peter Camejo – 119 (10.56%)
Ralph Nader – 118 (10.47%)
Kent Mesplay – 43 (3.82%)
Lorna Salzman – 40 (3.55%)
None of the above – 36 (3.19%)
JoAnne Bier Beeman – 14 (1.24%)
Carol A. Miller – 10 (0.89%)
Dennis Kucinich – 9 (0.80%)
Uncommitted – 7 (0.62%)
Paul Glover – 6 (0.53%)
Abstaining – 3 (0.27%)
Jonathan Farley – 3 (0.27%)
Sheila Bilyeu – 2 (0.18%)
Eugene Victor Debs – 1 (0.09%)

2004 Democratic National Convention (presidential tally)
John Kerry – 4,255 (99.14%)
Dennis Kucinich – 37 (0.86%)

== U.S. House of Representatives (2004–2006) ==
Ohio's 10th congressional district, 2004
Dennis Kucinich, Democrat (incumbent) – 172,406 (60.03%)
Edward Fitzpatrick Herman, Republican – 96,463 (33.59%)
Barbara Anne Ferris, independent – 18,343 (6.39%)

Ohio's 10th congressional district, 2006 (Democratic primary)
Dennis Kucinich (incumbent) – 51,485 (76.42%)
Barbara Anne Ferris – 15,890 (23.58%)

Ohio's 10th congressional district, 2006
Dennis Kucinich, Democrat (incumbent) – 138,393 (66.41%)
Mike Dovilla, Republican – 69,996 (33.59%)

== U.S. presidential election, 2008 ==
2008 New Hampshire Democratic vice presidential primary

Raymond Stebbins – 50,485 (46.93%)
William Bryk – 22,965 (21.35%)
John Edwards – 10,553 (9.81%)
Barack Obama 6,402 (5.95%)
Bill Richardson (write-in) – 5,525 (5.14%)
Hillary Clinton (write-in) – 3,419 (3.18%)
Joe Biden – 1,512 (1.41%)
Al Gore – 966 (0.90%)
Dennis Kucinich – 762 (0.71%)
Bill Clinton – 388 (0.36%)
John McCain – 293 (0.27%)
Chris Dodd – 224 (0.21%)
Ron Paul – 176 (0.16%)
Jack Barnes, Jr. – 95 (0.09%)
Mike Gravel – 91 (0.09%)
Joe Lieberman – 67 (0.06%)
Mitt Romney – 66 (0.06%)
Mike Huckabee – 63 (0.06%)
Rudy Giuliani – 46 (0.04%)
Darrel Hunter – 20 (0.02%)

2008 Democratic presidential primaries, excluding the Florida and Michigan contests, only primary and caucuses votes
Barack Obama – 16,706,853
Hillary Rodham Clinton – 16,239,821
John Edwards – 742,010
Bill Richardson – 89,054
Uncommitted delegates – 82,660
Dennis Kucinich – 68,482
Joe Biden – 64,041
Mike Gravel – 27,662
Chris Dodd – 25,300
Others – 22,556

2008 Democratic presidential primaries, including the Florida and Michigan contests
Hillary Rodham Clinton – 18,225,175 (48.03%)
Barack Obama – 17,988,182 (47.41%)
John Edwards – 1,006,275 (2.65%)
Uncommitted delegates – 299,610 (0.79%)
Bill Richardson – 106,073 (0.28%)
Dennis Kucinich – 103,994 (0.27%)
Joe Biden – 81,641 (0.22%)
Scattering – 44,348 (0.12%)
Mike Gravel – 40,251 (0.11%)
Chris Dodd – 35,281 (0.09%)

== U.S. House of Representatives (2008–2012; 2024) ==
Ohio's 10th congressional district, 2008 (Democratic primary)
Dennis Kucinich (incumbent) – 72,646 (50.32%)
Joe Cimperman – 50,760 (35.16%)
Barbara Anne Ferris – 9,362 (6.48%)
Thomas E. O'Grady – 7,264 (5.03%)
Rosemary A. Palmer – 4,339 (3.01%)

Ohio's 10th congressional district, 2008
Dennis Kucinich, Democrat (incumbent) – 157,268 (57.02%)
Jim Trakas, Republican – 107,918 (39.13%)
Paul Conroy, Libertarian Party – 10,623 (3.85%)

Ohio's 10th congressional district, 2010
Dennis Kucinich, Democrat (incumbent) – 101,343 (53.05%)
Peter J. Corrigan, Republican – 83,809 (43.87%)
Jeff Goggins, Libertarian – 5,874 (3.07%)

Ohio's 9th congressional district, 2012 (Democratic primary)
Marcy Kaptur (incumbent) – 42,902 (56.18%)
Dennis Kucinich (incumbent) – 30,564 (40.02%)
Graham Veysey – 2,900 (3.80%)

Ohio's 7th congressional district, 2024
Max Miller, Republican (incumbent) – 200,962 (51.13%)
Matthew Diemer, Democrat – 141,741 (36.06%)
Dennis Kucinich, Independent – 50,321 (12.80%)

== Governor of Ohio (2018) ==
Ohio gubernatorial election, 2018 (Democratic primary, unofficial results)
Richard Cordray and Betty Sutton – 423,264 (62.27%)
Dennis Kucinich and Tara L. Samples – 155,694 (22.91%)
Joe Schiavoni and Stephanie Dodd – 62,315 (9.17%)
Bill O'Neill and Chantelle C. Lewis – 22,196 (3.27%)
Paul E. Ray and Jerry M. Schroeder – 9,373 (1.38%)
Larry E. Ealy and Jeffrey Lynn – 6,896 (1.01%)
