= Mayoralty of Dennis Kucinich =

1977–79 mayoralty in Cleveland, Ohio, US

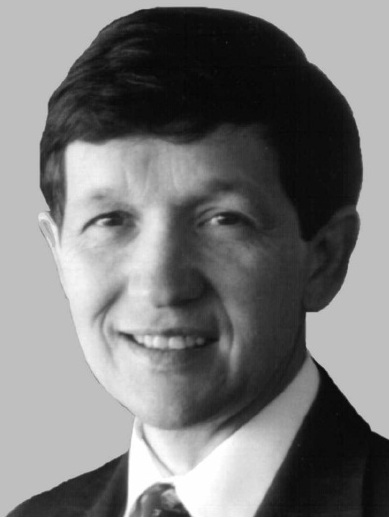
- Mayoralty of Dennis Kucinich; November 14, 1977 – November 6, 1979
- Mayor: Dennis Kucinich
- Party: Democrat
- Election: 1977, 1978 recall, 1979
- Seal of Cleveland, Ohio

The mayoralty of Dennis Kucinich lasted from November 14, 1977 to November 6, 1979, while he served as the 53rd Mayor of Cleveland, Ohio. The Kucinich administration is often regarded as one of the most tumultuous in Cleveland's history. The mayor relied heavily on confrontation politics, a style that "alienated business and civic leaders, the news media, and, ultimately, even those neighborhood groups that had been his chief supporters." His supporters, however, assert that Kucinich "championed the public good over private-sector rights and pointed to inequities that result when business-centered economic growth (like corporate collusion and tax abatements) is prioritized over neighborhoods. He stood steadfastly for public ownership of utilities in Cleveland."

== Tenure ==
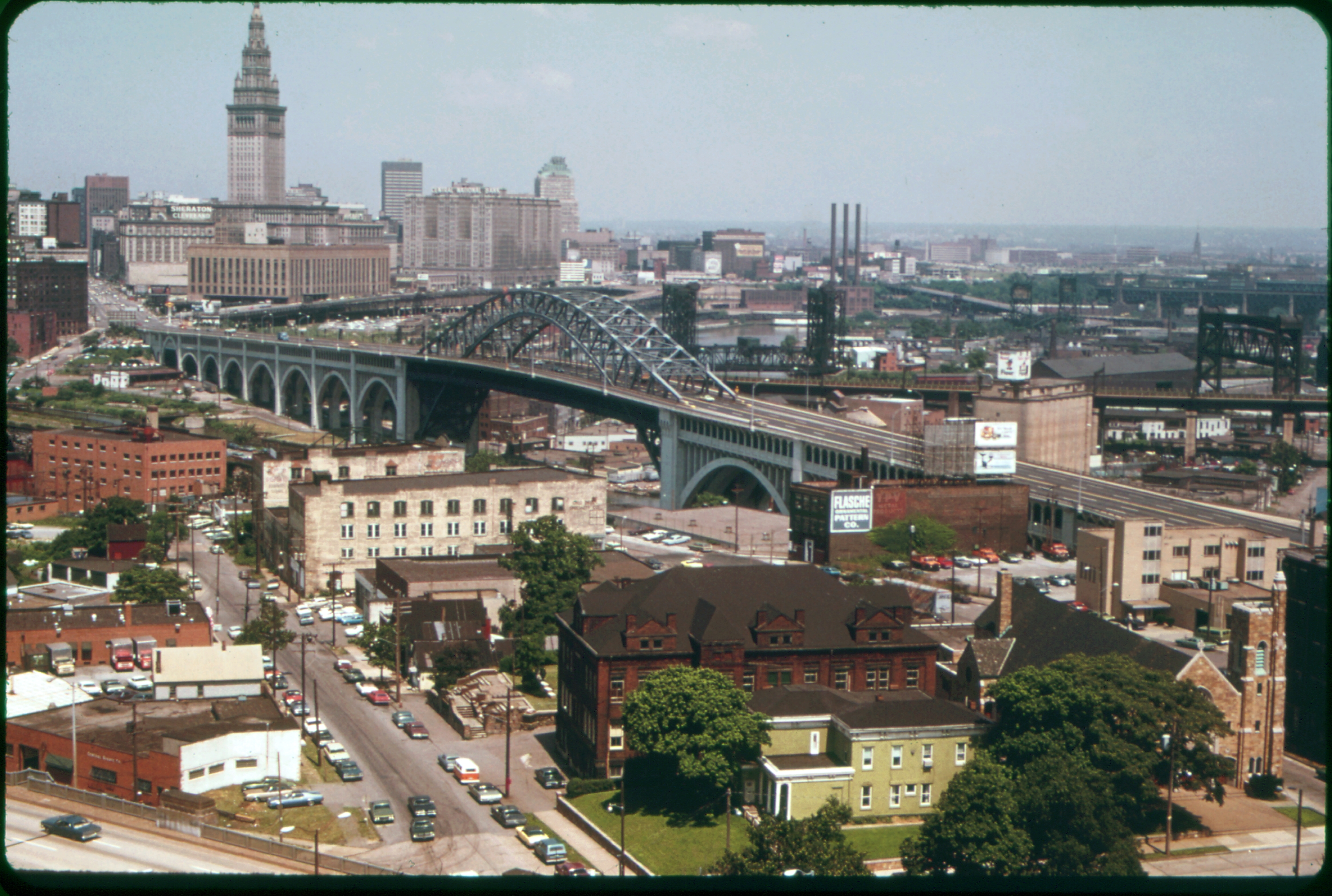
Cleveland in the 1970s

=== 1977 election ===
Under Republican Mayor Ralph Perk, Cleveland's mayoral elections had become nonpartisan. Initially, Kucinich, a Democrat, supported Perk. However, he started to criticize Perk, eventually broke off with him, and began making plans to run for mayor himself. Democratic support went to Edward F. Feighan, who was then a member of the Ohio House of Representatives.

Many expected the real race to be between Kucinich and Feighan battling for the second spot and a run off against Perk. However, by the time of the mayoral primary, it became increasingly difficult for the city to meet its expenses. Some felt the city's publicly owned electric company, Municipal Light (Muny Light, today Cleveland Public Power) should be sold to a private electric company, the Cleveland Electric Illuminating Company (CEI). Perk agreed to the sale, a move that became one of the most heated election issues during the primary. Both Kucinich and Feighan attacked the mayor on the issue, demanding that the sale be canceled. As a result, Perk finished third behind both candidates.

In his campaign, Kucinich hearkened back to the mayoralty of Tom L. Johnson, a progressive mayor who governed the city from 1901 to 1909. Kucinich ran on Johnson's populist philosophy, which he felt would serve to solve the city's problems. Tax abatement became the new issue held against Feighan. As a state representative, Feighan chaired the committee that passed tax abatement legislation in the Ohio House and now was unable to backtrack on the issue. In the general election, Kucinich won with 51% of the vote, against Feighan who received 49%. At 31, he became the youngest mayor of a major U.S. city at that point.

=== Beginning of tenure ===
Kucinich's term as mayor began in January 1978, a time when Cleveland and Northeast Ohio were suffering from unrelenting snowfall, to the point where the metropolitan area was considered a "disaster zone." Additionally on January 26, the worst blizzard in the city's history hit with winds exceeding 100 miles an hour.

Despite this, once in office, Kucinich moved to reverse actions of the Perk administration that he campaigned against. He rejected a $41 million federal grant for an Urban Mass Transportation Administration people mover to be built in Downtown Cleveland. In 1976, Cleveland was one of four cities to receive federal support on such a project. The mayor commented afterwards that the people mover ought to go "back to Disneyland where it belongs." He also vetoed eight ordinances, most of which were tax abatements and subsidies. Kucinich's cabinet appointees were criticized by local media and business and civic leaders for including members who were too young or inexperienced to handle their respective positions. For example, Kucinich's appointment of 24-year-old attorney Joseph Tegreene as his finance director alarmed business leaders, due to Tegreene's lack of financial experience.

=== Hongisto feud ===
As mayor-elect, Kucinich appointed the former San Francisco sheriff, Richard D. Hongisto as chief of police, a decision he would later come to regret. Hongisto became immensely popular in Cleveland, especially with the city's ethnic Eastern European community. The chief was also popular with the media, especially after Hongisto saved a person from a snow bank during the 1978 blizzard. However, on March 23, Kucinich publicly suspended Hongisto for refusing to accept civilian control. For his part, Hongisto asserted that Kucinich interfered with the operation of the Cleveland Police Department. He stated that Kucinich's executive secretary Bob Weissman had pressured him to "punish" Kucinich opponents on City Council and to reward police jobs to Kucinich supporters with "questionable ethics." In turn, Kucinich charged Hongisto with insubordination. In a televised press conference on Good Friday, Kucinich gave Hongisto a 24-hour deadline to support his assertions. Then the mayor fired the chief on live television.

=== 1978 recall election ===
After Hongisto's discharge, both critics and former supporters alike felt that Kucinich's actions against the police were too rash and that his administration was not capable of governing a struggling city. A drive began to remove the mayor from his post through a recall election. The first recall election in the city's history was set for August 13. Kucinich ended up winning, but by a narrow margin of 236 votes.

=== Municipal Light ===
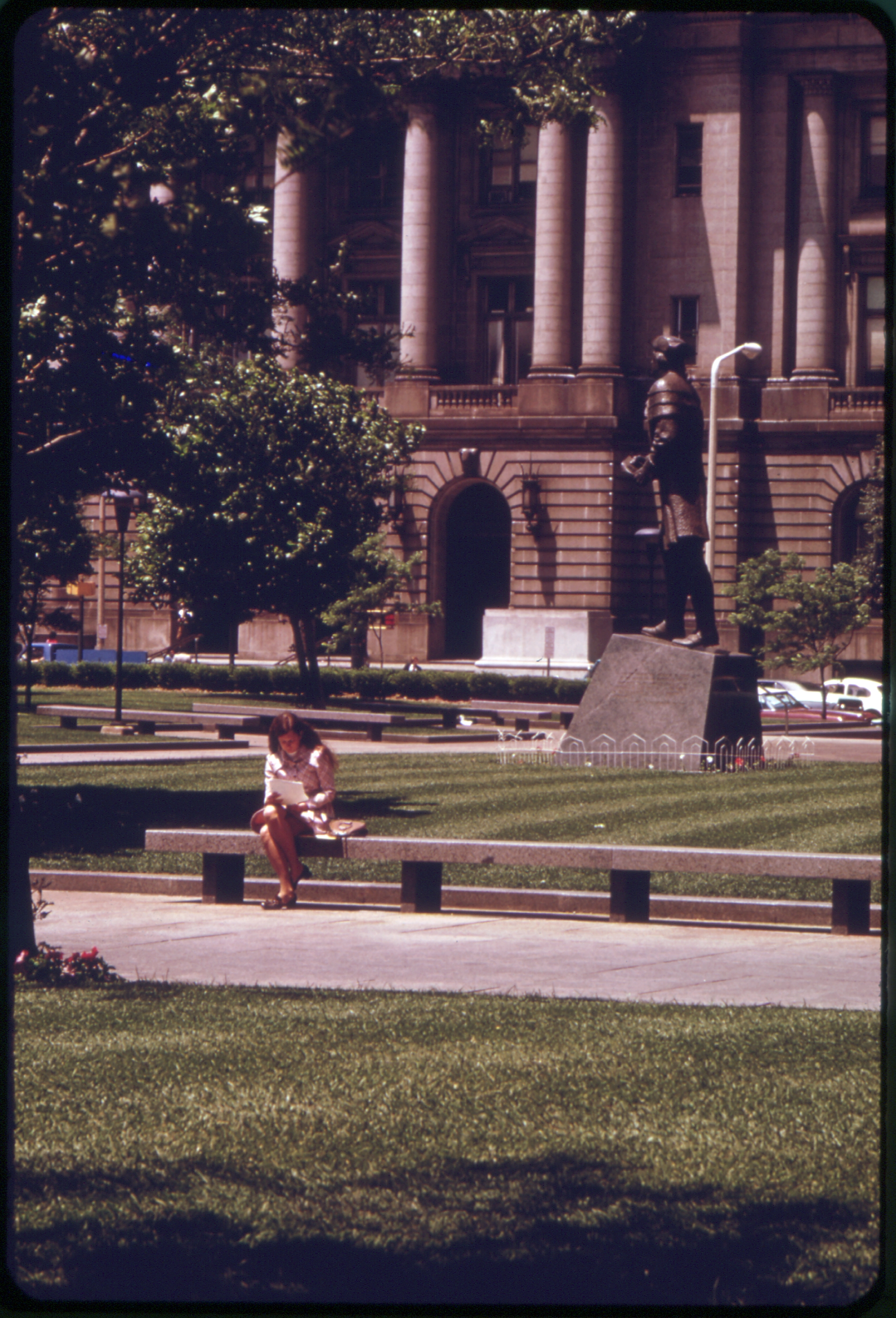
Cleveland City Hall in 1973

For years, CEI sought to acquire Muny Light and violated federal antitrust laws on several occasions in its attempt to absorb it. The Atomic Safety and Licensing Board of the Nuclear Regulatory Commission (NRC) determined that CEI blocked Muny Light from making repairs to its generator by lobbying the city council to place restrictive conditions on Muny Light bonds. Because of the delay in repairs, Muny Light had to purchase power. CEI would then work behind the scenes to block Muny Light from purchasing electricity from other power companies. Consequently, CEI became the only power company from which Muny Light could buy. At that point, CEI started to engage in price gouging by dramatically increasing the cost of electricity to Muny, thereby forcing Muny to lose funds. The NRC referred to CEI's actions as an "outrageous affront" to federal antitrust law. The city launched an antitrust suit against CEI in 1975. However, for the power purchased by Muny, CEI went to court to demand that it pay $14 million in damages. Former mayor Perk had intended to pay the cost by selling the light system, simultaneously disposing of a $328 million antitrust suit that the city had filed against CEI.

The Kucinich administration not only stopped the sale, but revived the city's antitrust lawsuit against CEI. For its part, CEI went to federal court to secure an order to attach city property. To pay the city's debt to CEI, Kucinich moved to cut municipal spending. However, local business leaders "did not like the populist rhetoric of Kucinich's philosophy" and were "determined to fight it to the end." Consequently, the Cleveland Trust Company (then the largest bank in the city and the state, and now part of Key Bank) and five other Cleveland banks told Kucinich that if he did not agree to sell Muny to CEI, they would not renew the city's credit on $14 million of loans taken out by the prior administration. City Council, led by Kucinich's then-political nemesis George L. Forbes, sided with CEI and the banks and pressured the mayor to make the sale. However, Kucinich still refused and instead proposed saving money by laying off 600 employees, including 400 police officers and firefighters. In addition, he proposed a $50 million bond issue to pay the Muny debt and even agreed to seek an increase in the city income tax, a controversial stance that he had earlier strongly opposed.

As the week dragged on, the mayor appeared on ABC's Good Morning America and repeated his vow not to sell. The city's surrounding suburbs offered little financial support. Only 12 of the 59 agreed to help in a plan led by University Heights mayor Beryl Rotheschild. These suburbs included Bay Village, Bedford, Fairview Park, Garfield Heights, Lakewood, Maple Heights, Newburgh Heights, North Royalton, Orange, Richmond Heights, University Heights, and Westlake. Three of the six banks that held Cleveland's $14 million in notes presented the notes for redemption at the office of the city treasurer at Cleveland City Hall. They stated that they were willing to listen if the city developed "a financial plan satisfactory to all parties involved." Meanwhile, news reporters from around the nation flocked to Cleveland to watch as the situation intensified.

On December 14 at 11 p.m. (EST), Council met to consider a resolution that only gave Kucinich a stark choice: sell Muny Light or claim default. At the same session, Kucinich handed each Council member a letter advising him or her that he was exercising the right given to him to call the special council meeting. However, council refused to hold a special meeting. At midnight on December 15, 1978, amid dramatic closed-door deliberations at City Hall involving the mayor, council members, and CEI business leaders, Cleveland became the first major American city to go into financial default since the Great Depression.

On February 27, 1979, the city held a special election to decide two ballot issues: the sale of Muny Light and an increase on income tax. "I have always opposed unnecessary and unfair tax increases," Kucinich stated in a leaflet distributed throughout Cleveland. "Today I am asking for your support for Issue #2–a 1/2% tax increase–only because Cleveland has no other choice." Issue #1 failed and Muny Light was never sold. Issue #2 passed, increasing the city's income tax from 1 percent to 1.5 percent to provide more revenue. Public power was continued in Cleveland.

=== 1979 election ===
Kucinich ran for re-election as mayor in 1979. His challenger was Republican George V. Voinovich, who initially supported Kucinich in 1977, but decided to give up his position as lieutenant governor of Ohio to run for mayor. On November 6, Voinovich won the general election with 56% of the vote, to 44% for Kucinich.

Notably, during his subsequent administration, Voinovich defended Muny Light as CEI continued making attempts to take it over. CEI itself was subsequently acquired and is now part of FirstEnergy. Muny Light is now known as Cleveland Public Power and is still in city hands, used today throughout parts of Cleveland. After the 2003 North America blackout, First Energy was identified as a contributor to the disaster due to various failures. Kucinich began to advocate for liability proceedings.

== Overview ==
Critics of Kucinich's performance as mayor cite the city's economic decline during his stewardship. Known as the "boy mayor" due to his age and youthful appearance, Kucinich was also satirized in local media as "Dennis the Menace," a reference to Hank Ketcham's Dennis the Menace comic strip and to Kucinich's confrontational political style. Plain Dealer journalist George E. Condon once referred to Kucinich as the "enfant terrible of Cleveland politics." A 1985 survey of historians, political scientists and urban experts conducted by Melvin G. Holli of the University of Illinois at Chicago saw Kucinich ranked as the fifth-worst mayor among all American big-city mayors who served in office since 1820. A 1993 iteration of the same survey similarly saw Kucinich ranked seventh-worst. When the latter survey was limited only to mayors that were in office post-1960, the results saw Kucinich ranked the second-worst.

However, Kucinich's supporters say that Kucinich kept his campaign promise of refusing to sell Muny Light to CEI and was brave for not giving into big business. "There is little debate over the value of Muny Light today," wrote Cleveland Magazine in May 1996. "Now Cleveland Public Power, it is a proven asset to the city that between 1985 and 1995 saved its customers $195,148,520 over what they would have paid CEI." Kucinich's move also preserved hundreds of union jobs. On December 14, 1998, city council granted Kucinich amnesty, stating that he had "the courage and foresight to refuse to sell the city's municipal electric system." In subsequent years since his mayoralty, observers also began to notice that the once confrontational Kucinich became more politically mature. "He is a remarkably practical and astute politician," observed writer Studs Terkel. "His Ohio track record tells you that."

In 1989, Cleveland artist James C. Kulhanek offered to paint a portrait of Kucinich after discovering that the former mayor was not represented with one in Cleveland City Hall. Kucinich met with Kulhanek several times to provide references and to pose for the portrait, and Kulhanek died shortly after completing the painting. Due to a number of changes in administrations and other circumstances, the portrait ended up not being displayed publicly.
