= George E. Condon =

American journalist

- Born: November 6, 1916; Fall River, Massachusetts
- Died: October 7, 2011 (aged 94); Cleveland, Ohio
- Occupations: Journalist, author

George E. Condon (November 6, 1916 – October 7, 2011) was an American journalist, writer, and local historian based in Cleveland, Ohio.

== Early life ==
One of eight siblings, he was born in Fall River, Massachusetts to immigrants John J. Condon (from County Waterford, Ireland) and Mary (O'Malley) Condon (from Blackburn, Lancashire, England). He moved to Cleveland with his family in 1923, settling in a powder blue up and down double house on W. 32nd Street in the "Little Achill" neighborhood on the city's West Side. He attended St. Patrick School on Bridge Avenue before going to West Tech High School, from which he graduated in 1935.

== Career ==
As the country was in The Great Depression, Condon went to work for the Atlas Display Fixture Company in Cleveland, then did office work for the Block Clothing Store, also in Cleveland, saving enough money to attend Ohio State University. While working as the student editor of OSU's Daily Lantern newspaper, Condon met Marjorie Philona Smith. Condon graduated in 1940 with a Bachelor's of Science degree in journalism.

Following his graduation, Condon took a job in 1940 as Publicity Director at Mount Union College. A year later, in 1941, he took a job with the Agricultural Administration for Ohio in Columbus, serving as Information Director. He and Marjorie were married in 1942, following her graduation from OSU with a BS in journalism. They moved to Cleveland in 1943, where he began his long career in journalism at The Cleveland Plain Dealer, and where he developed a reputation for "wit, wisdom and amiable prose style." Condon was a general assignments reporter from 1943 until 1948, when he was assigned to be the paper's first TV and Radio Critic. He held that title until 1962, writing 7 or more columns a week. In 1962, Condon was assigned to be a general columnist on the op-ed pages, writing 5 columns weekly until his retirement in 1984.

He also authored several books on Cleveland history and earned numerous literary awards for his work. His books include: Cleveland, The Best Kept Secret; Laughter from the Rafters; Cleveland: Prodigy of the Western Reserve; Stars in the Water; The Man in the Arena: The Life and Times of A.C. Sutphin; Gaels of Laughter and Tears; Yesterday's Cleveland; Yesterday's Columbus; and West of the Cuyahoga.

George E. Condon won the Ohioana Award for History; Women's City Club of Cleveland Award for Literature; the Burke Award for Literature; Sigma Delta Chi's Award for Distinguished Service; and Emily Gray Burke Memorial Award. He is in the West Tech Hall of Fame, and he was inducted into the Cleveland Press Club's Journalism Hall of Fame in 1990. In 2007, he was honored by the Irish American Archives Society with the 2007 Walks of Life Award.

== Works ==
- Condon, George E. (1967). "Cleveland: The Best Kept Secret". Cleveland Memory. New York: Doubleday.
- Condon, George E. (1968). Laughter from the Rafters. New York: Doubleday.
- Condon, George E. (1974). Stars in the Water: The Story of the Erie Canal. New York: Doubleday. ISBN 0385066422.
- Condon, George E. (1976). Yesterday's Cleveland. Miami: E.A. Seemann. ISBN 0-912458-73-9.
- Condon, George E. (1979). Cleveland: Prodigy of the Western Reserve. Tulsa: Continental Heritage Press. ISBN 9780932986061.
- Condon, George E. (1995). Gaels of Laughter and Tears. Waterford Books. ISBN 0614112664.
- Condon, George E. (2006). West of the Cuyahoga. Kent, OH: Kent State University Press. ISBN 0-87338-854-2.

== Personal life ==
George and Marjorie Condon had 7 children in 15 years, and he outlived 2 of them. Marjorie, a teacher in the Cleveland Public School system for 20 years, died in March 2001. They were married for 59 years.
