= Southworth House (Cleveland) =

Historic house in Ohio, United States

- U.S. National Register of Historic Places
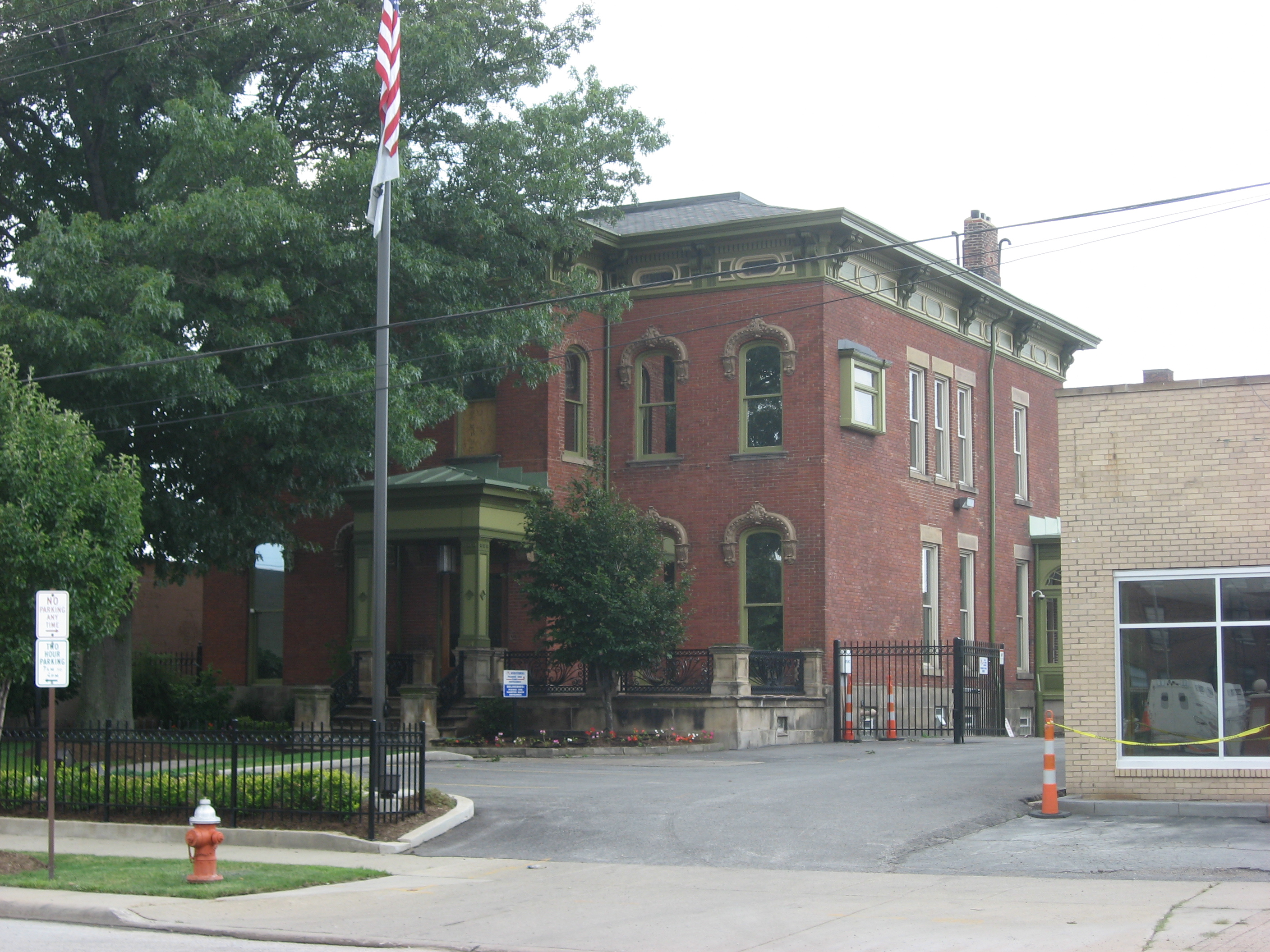
- Street view of the Southworth House

- Location within Cleveland Location within Ohio Location within the United States
- Location: 3334 Prospect Ave., Cleveland, Ohio
- Coordinates: 41°30′4″N 81°39′48″W
- Area: less than one acre
- Built: 1879
- Architectural style: Neoclassical, Italianate
- MPS: Upper Prospect MRA
- NRHP reference No.: 84000234
- Added to NRHP: November 1, 1984

The Southworth House is a Classical Revival and Italianate house in Cleveland, Ohio, United States that was built in 1879. Named for its first owner, W.P. Southworth, a leading resident of late nineteenth-century Cleveland, the house has been used for a variety of commercial purposes in recent decades. One of many historic sites in its eastside neighborhood, it has been listed on the National Register of Historic Places since 1984.

== Construction ==
The house was built in 1879 by William Palmer Southworth, a Cleveland businessman who established W.P. Southworth Co., a leading Cleveland grocery, in the 1850s. He and his wife Louise were prominent in Cleveland society; while she was a leader of the women's suffrage movement, his store (located in Public Square downtown) was significant enough that its destruction by fire in 1882 prompted a front-page story in The New York Times.

The house is built on a stone foundation with a basement, with walls of brick; the architect's name is not known. Its three floors were divided into nineteen rooms, and by 1904 Southworth had installed an elevator. The elevator remains today.

== After Southworth ==
In August 1906, a group of Cleveland Baptists incorporated an organization, the Baptist Home of Northern Ohio, to establish a retirement home for elderly Baptists. Ten months later, Southworth sold his house to the organization, which was supported financially by industrialist and philanthropist John D. Rockefeller, who was a Baptist. With the aid of local churches, the home was opened on October 16, 1907. According to the 1910 census, the Baptist Home served fourteen residents at the end of 1910, at which time the entire property was worth $15,000. The former Southworth residence was not long a retirement home: the Baptist Home moved to a new location in 1919 and sold the Southworth House in the same year. Since that time, the house has been used for a wide range of purposes.

During the 1950s and 1960s, various businesses had offices in the house, which was then called the "Edelmar Building" or the "Accountants Building." In 1973, the Southworth House was purchased by Pi Sigma Tau Alpha, a fraternity based at the nearby Cleveland State University; it later served as the fraternity house for Cleveland State's chapter of Delta Sigma Phi. The house has changed hands several times since its fraternity days. In 1997, a healthcare company bought it; in 2005, after the company was found to be fraudulent and the owner imprisoned, a historic preservation company bought the property at auction, and it too has since sold the house. By the late 2000s, the Southworth House had become the location of offices for organizations such as an actual healthcare company and a local of the Laborers' International Union of North America.

== Preservation ==
The Southworth House is recognized as a landmark both locally and nationally. Along with many other properties along Prospect Avenue, it was added to the National Register of Historic Places on November 1, 1984, as part of the "Upper Prospect Multiple Resource Area." It was included both for its distinctive combination of Classical Revival and Italianate architecture and for its association with Southworth. As the "Delta Sigma Phi Fraternity House," it has been designated a Cleveland Landmark by the city of Cleveland. Since being listed on the Register in 1984, the Southworth House has been the focus of both publicly funded and privately funded historic preservation efforts.

In late 1996, as Sunrise Home Health Care prepared to buy the Southworth House, Cleveland City Council provided over $250,000 to help purchase and renovate the property. Architects Scott and Analia Dimit began a restoration of the house for developer Michael Chesler, and continued to guide its restoration when it was purchased by Laborers Union Local 860 in 2005. The construction workers made it their union hall, completing the work in October 2007. In October 2009, the National Trust for Historic Preservation recognized the restoration with its Honor Award. Today, the house features wrought ironwork and a distinctive Italianate facade.

== See also ==
- North American fraternity and sorority housing
