= History of Cleveland Clinic =

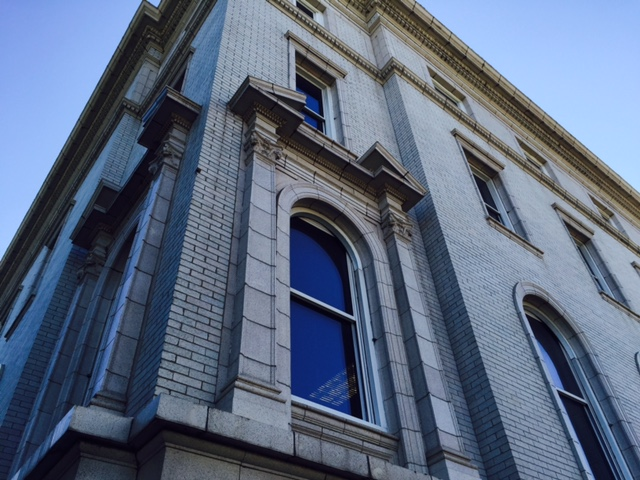
Cleveland Clinic's original building, built in 1921

The Cleveland Clinic was established in 1921 as a group surgical-medical practice with its own dedicated hospital in Cleveland, in the U.S. state of Ohio.

== Early beginnings ==
=== Origins ===
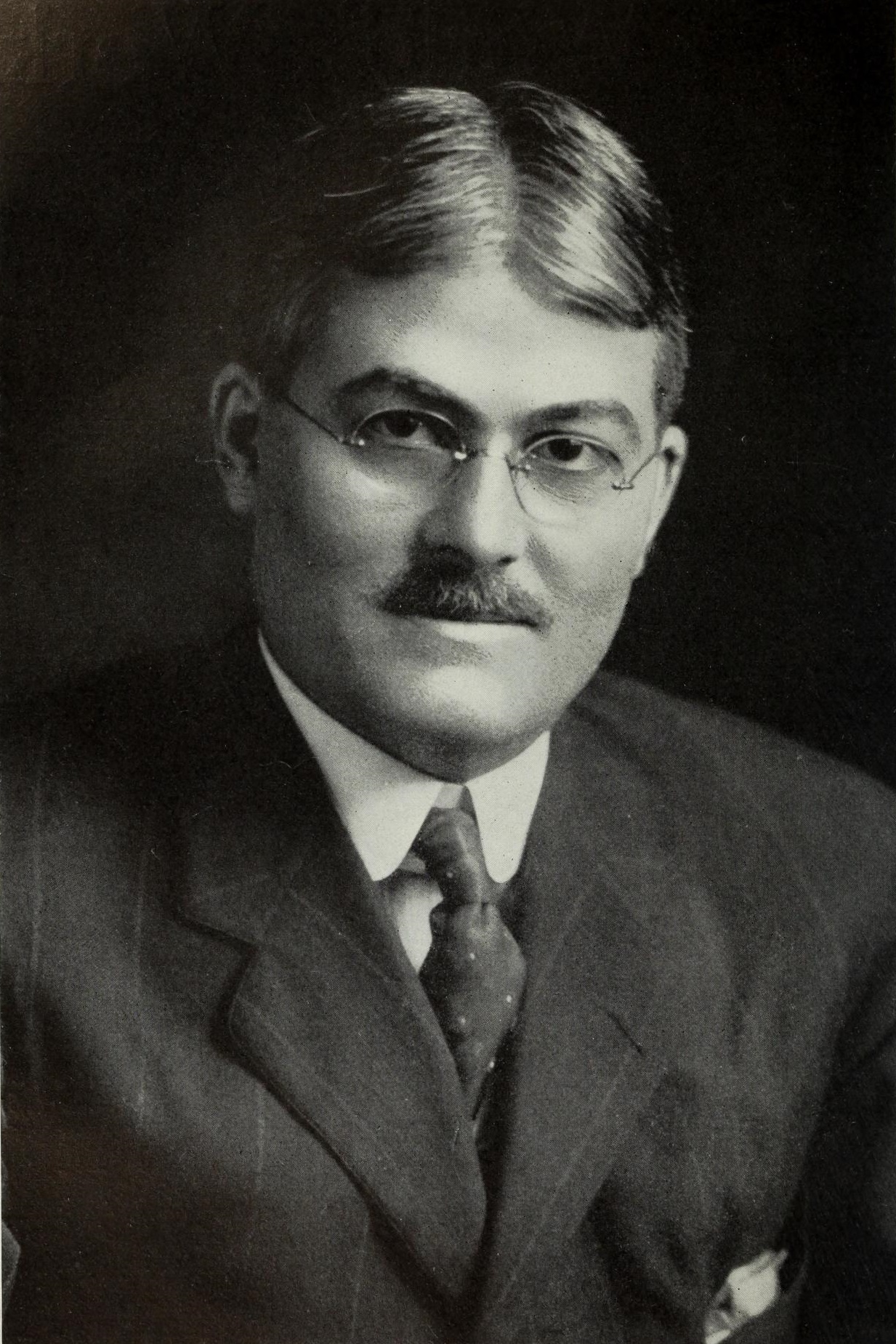
George Washington Crile, MD, one of the four founders

The Cleveland Clinic had its roots in the Lakeside Unit, an American First World War medical-surgical unit consisting of volunteers from Cleveland's Western Reserve University Lakeside Hospital, (now part of the University Hospitals medical system), organized and led by George W. Crile, MD the hospital's chief of surgery. The Lakeside Unit, formally designated U.S. Army Base Hospital No. 4, was part of the American Expeditionary Forces and attached to the British Army Medical Hospital near Rouen. The Unit served the American sick and wounded throughout WWI. The experience of caring for patients as a group appealed to Crile and two of his partners, Frank E. Bunts, MD, and William E. Lower, MD. Lower later wrote of his admiration for the "teamwork and efficient organization" of military medicine. The three began to explore the possibility of establishing a similar sort of practice together in Cleveland after their return from the war. Upon their return to Cleveland, Crile, Bunts and Lower asked a fourth Cleveland physician from Western Reserve Medical School, John Philips, MD, also a WWI veteran of the Army medical service, to join them in a group practice. Philips was an internist and a pediatrician and complemented the surgical expertise of the other three. The four of them together founded the Cleveland Clinic on February 5, 1921.

Crile, Bunts, and Lower, already shared a surgical practice in Cleveland before they left to serve in the Lakeside Unit. Crile and Bunts started together as assistants in the surgical practice of Frank J. Weed, MD, at 16 Church Street on the near west side of Cleveland. When Weed died in 1891, Crile and Bunts purchased his practice. In 1892, they brought in Crile's cousin, William E. Lower, MD. In 1897, they moved their practice to the Osborn Building on Prospect Avenue in downtown Cleveland.

At the time of the founding of the Cleveland Clinic, there was a great deal of opposition to the whole idea of a comprehensive group medical practice, but Crile, Bunts and Lower were sufficiently well respected in Cleveland — all three were professors at one or more of Cleveland medical schools, and each of the three, at one time or other was elected president of the local Academy of Medicine — that they were able to bring their plans for the Clinic to fruition.

=== First years of operation ===
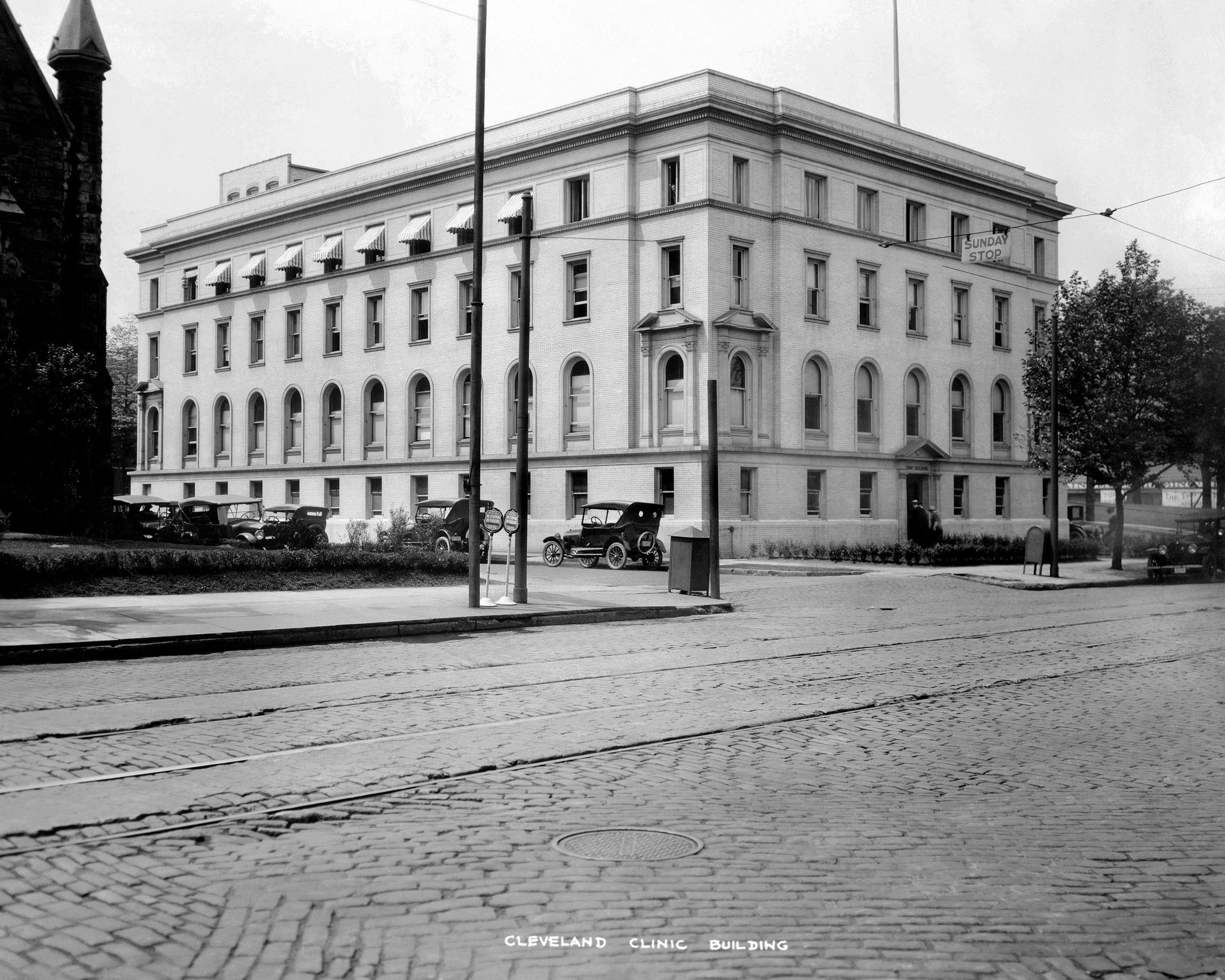
Original Cleveland Clinic outpatient building

The four purchased land at the corner of Euclid Avenue and E. 93rd St in Cleveland and constructed a four-story building with facilities for outpatient clinics and inpatient hospitalization, along with a medical laboratory. The building, which still stands and is still used as part of the Clinic's mission, was dedicated at a private ceremony on February 26, 1921. William James Mayo, MD, of the Mayo Clinic, delivered the main address. On February 28, 1921, Cleveland Clinic opened its doors to the public and registered 42 patients. In April 1921, Cleveland Clinic had 60 employees, including 14 physicians, four nurses, a telephone operator, six cleaners, 22 clerical workers, an art department, and an unknown number of laboratory technicians. In 1922, the founders purchased four private homes nearby used for hospitalization, radiation treatment, and administration. A fifth house was acquired as a residence for patients with diabetes receiving insulin treatments. To meet rising patient volume, a 184-bed hospital was built in 1924, located at East 90th Street and Carnegie Avenue. A power plant, laundry, and ice plant were also built. A research laboratory was constructed in 1928.

=== Disaster and recovery ===
On May 15, 1929, nitrocellulose x-ray films stored in the basement of the outpatient building ignited. An explosion sent a cloud of toxic oxides of nitrogen and carbon though the building. One hundred and twenty-three people lost their lives, and ninety-two others were injured. Among the dead were forty-three Clinic employees, including co-founder John Phillips, many of whom died from smoke inhalation after heroic efforts to save the lives of their patients. A dozen investigating agencies were not able to determine a single cause for the Cleveland Clinic fire of 1929. Cleveland Clinic's own inquiry narrowed the possible causes down to three: spontaneous combustion caused by heat; a discarded cigarette or match; contact with an extension cord light hung over a stack of films.

Philanthropist Samuel Livingston Mather II formed a committee of 36 community leaders to help Cleveland Clinic reestablish itself in temporary quarters across the street. Patient care services resumed five days later. The 1921 building was completely renovated, and a new three story clinic building, with a new main entrance, was added in 1931. All debts were repaid by 1941.

== Growth of specialization ==
=== Leadership ===
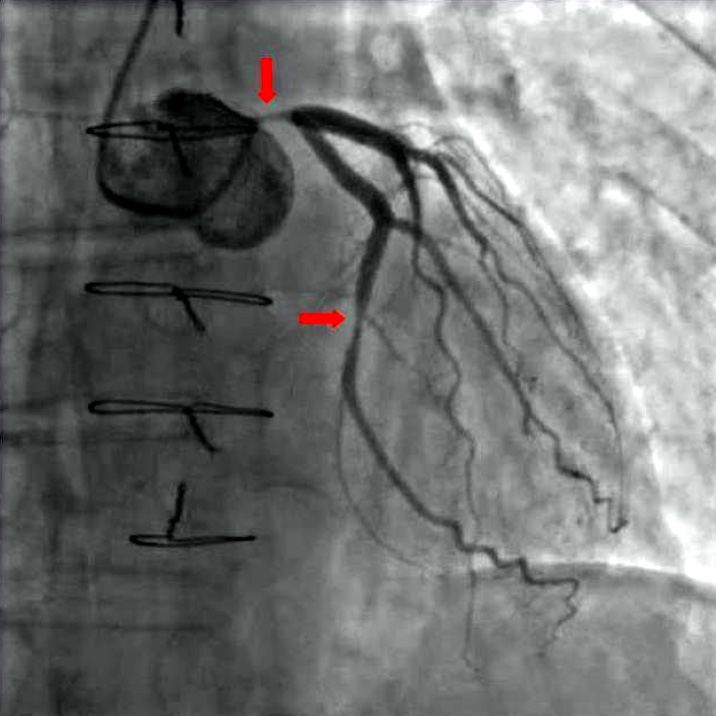
Cine-coronary angiography was developed at Cleveland Clinic by F. Mason Sones, MD, in the late 1950s.

Crile and Lower relinquished their administrative duties in 1941. In 1942 Cleveland Clinic's Naval Reserve Unit, which included George Crile, Jr., MD, son of one of the founders, established a mobile hospital in New Zealand to treat wounded from the Guadalcanal Campaign.

In 1954 Cleveland Clinic formally adopted governance by a physician-led Board of Governors. The nine physician governors are elected by the physician staff. They work with the CEO and lay administrators to formulate and carry out policy, overseen by a board of directors and board of trustees This is a list of the chairman of the Board of Governors, and their terms of office:

- Fay Lefevre, MD, 1954–1968
- Carle E. Wasmuth, MD, 1968–1973
- William S. Kiser, MD, 1973–1989
- Floyd D. Loop, MD, 1989–2004
- Delos M. Cosgrove, MD, 2004–2017.
- Tomislav "Tom" Mihaljevic, MD, 2018–present

=== Organization ===
Until 2007 Cleveland Clinic's largest organizational unit was the division: division > department > section. There was a Division of Medicine, Division of Surgery, Division of Anesthesiology, etc. Within each division were departments (Department of Infectious Disease, Department of Cell Biology, etc.). Within each department were sections, (Section of Headache and Facial Pain, Section of Metastatic Disease, etc.). Divisions and departments were led by chairs, and section were led by heads. In 2007, Cleveland Clinic reorganized patient care services around disease and organ-system-based institutes.

=== Growing facilities ===
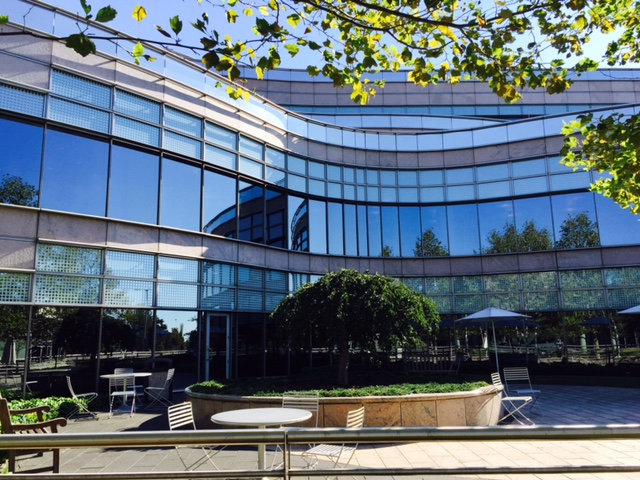
Cleveland Clinic Taussig Cancer Institute

Cleveland Clinic built new operating rooms in the early 1970s to accommodate the growth of cardiac surgery. The Martha Holding Jennings Education Building opened in 1964, with an auditorium named for Bunts. A new hospital building (currently home to Cleveland Clinic Children's) was opened in 1966, and a new research building went up in 1974 (demolished in 2007). A pathology and laboratory medicine building was constructed on Carnegie Avenue in 1980. Kiser led the development of a strategic plan to accommodate growing patient volumes in the late 1970s. This resulted in a group of buildings known as the Century Project. Completed in 1985, the Century Project including a 14-story outpatient building (now known as the Crile Building), designed by architect Cesar Pelli, .

=== Becoming a system ===
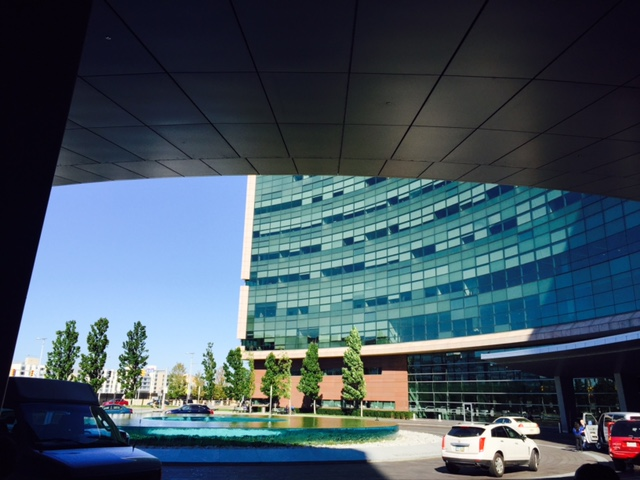
Patient drop-off roundabout and fountain at Cleveland Clinic's main entrance

Loop was appointed chairman of the Board of Governors in 1989. In the late 1990s, Cleveland Clinic merged with nine regional hospitals: Marymount Hospital, Lakewood Hospital, Fairview Hospital, Lutheran Hospital, South Pointe Hospital, Euclid Hospital, Health Hill Hospital, and Ashtabula County Medical Center (an affiliate hospital). (Medina Hospital joined the system in 2009; Akron General Hospital became an affiliate in 2015.)

For access from local communities, Cleveland Clinic began building what are now 18 Family Health and Service Centers across the region. These facilities offer primary care, specialty services and outpatient surgery.

Other Cleveland Clinic programs and facilities dating from 1998 to 2004 include the Sherwin Research Building, Children's Hospital, Cleveland Clinic Innovations, the Surgery Center, Neurological Imaging Center, Cleveland Clinic Sports Health, Intercontinental Hotel and Bank of America Conference Center. During this period also, Cleveland Clinic invested in electronic medical records system that now links all its sites. Cleveland Clinic Florida (begun in Ft. Lauderdale in 1988) opened a medical campus in Weston, Florida, with a hospital, outpatient clinic and 24-hour emergency room.

Loop launched a capital campaign in 1997 with a $16 million lead gift from the Norma and Al Lerner and family. This campaign raised $191 million to build the Lerner Research Institute, Cole Eye Institute, and Taussig Cancer Center. Another gift from the Lerner family enabled the launch of the Cleveland Clinic Lerner College of Medicine of the Case Western Reserve University (CWRU) School of Medicine in 2004. A $44 million Center for Genomics Research was completed in 2004, along with a new parking garage across the street from the 1921 building. In 2001 Loop announced plans for a new home for heart and vascular services. The campaign to finance the project continued after his retirement in 2004.
