= Cleveland Public Power =

Publicly-owned electricity generation and distribution company in Cleveland, Ohio, USA

Electric utility overview
- Formed: 1906
- Type: Public Utility
- Headquarters: Cleveland, Ohio; 41.50740°N 81.689523°W
- Motto: Count on It
- Electric utility executive: Ammon Danielson, Commissioner
- Website: www.cpp.org

Cleveland Public Power (also known as CPP) is a publicly owned electricity generation and distribution company in Cleveland, Ohio. It was founded in 1907 by then-Cleveland mayor Tom L. Johnson. Prior to 1983, it was known as Municipal Light (or "Muny Light" for short). CPP does not have sufficient capacity to compete across the entire Greater Cleveland area. Rather, it is intended to create additional capacity and to create a benchmark price in order to prevent price gouging by local private utilities and prevent the private market from controlling the city's electricity supply for municipal services such as streetlights and buildings. It also supplies electricity to the Cleveland Browns Stadium.

In December 1978, Mayor Dennis Kucinich refused to sell the company when a number of banks, which were heavily invested in Muny Light's largest privately owned competitor, the Cleveland Electric Illuminating Company (better known as CEI or The Illuminating Company) refused to roll over the city's debt, as had previously been customary. This was seen as a bad move at the time; unable to pay its debts, the city became the first since the Great Depression to enter default, which cost Kucinich his job in next year's mayoral election. However, Kucinich's decision was later vindicated by both city officials and the U.S. Senate, which found that CEI and the banks had acted improperly.

In December 2006, a new commissioner for CPP, Ivan Henderson, took over the reins from the incumbent James Majer. Under the new commissioner's leadership, CPP took over streetlight maintenance within the city from CEI.

As of August 2024, Ammon Danielson is the commissioner of CPP.
