= 1978 Cleveland mayoral recall election =

- August 13, 1978
- Shall Dennis Kucinich be recalled from the office of Mayor?

Results
Choice	Votes	%
Yes	60,014	49.90%
No	60,250	50.10%
Valid votes	120,264	99.97%
Invalid or blank votes	36	0.03%
Total votes	120,300	100.00%
Mayor before election
Dennis Kucinich
Democratic
Mayor after election
Dennis Kucinich
Democratic

The 1978 Cleveland recall election determined whether or not the 53rd Mayor of Cleveland, Dennis Kucinich, would be removed from office. It was the first mayoral recall election in the city's history.

== Background ==
On March 24, 1978, after an ongoing political feud, Kucinich fired his police chief of only four months, Richard Hongisto, on live local television. Capitalizing on the issue, Kucinich's opponents began circulating petitions for the mayor's recall. Kucinich's opponents faulted him for what they perceived to be an inability to compromise, as well as the youth and inexperience of some of his appointees, arguing he was incapable of governing a struggling city.

Support for recall increased as the mayor became involved in more political confrontations, especially with Cleveland City Council and its President George L. Forbes. When Council voted on April 10 to investigate the administration's "midnight raid" on the office of economic director Joseph Furber, Kucinich reacted strongly, calling Council "a bunch of buffoons" and "a group of lunatics." He added that "it's hard to believe that so many people can be so stupid," and asserted that "if they're not stupid then they are crooked, or maybe both." This led to Council members joining the recall drive against the mayor. Realizing his mistake, Kucinich offered an apology. However, on the same day, Kucinich's executive secretary Bob Weissman "assailed council and business leaders in a speech to the Harvard Business Club."

In the summer of 1978, Kucinich established special police patrols, in response to high crime in public housing projects. Police refused to obey the order, "calling the assignment 'too dangerous.'" The administration then suspended thirteen officers for their refusal to police the projects, ultimately touching off a two-day strike. It was the first official police strike in Cleveland's history.

Kucinich also came into conflict with Council over the proposed lease of municipal-owned Dock 20 on the Cuyahoga River to the Cleveland-Cuyahoga County Port Authority, which planned to construct a new ore dock with Republic Steel. Although Council supported the lease, the mayor opposed it, and at a Council meeting on July 10, he clashed with Council President Forbes over the proposal. "Stick to the issue," ordered Forbes. Kucinich responded, "Mr. Chairman, I determine the issue." "Not in this chamber," Forbes retorted. After using three of his four minutes at the podium to argue with Forbes, Kucinich used his remaining time to voice opposition to the lease. In response, Forbes declared the mayor out of order and shut off his microphone. Infuriated, Kucinich continued to protest: "I will not be silenced, Mr. Chairman! This is a corrupt deal!"

After a statement by Councilman Lonnie Burten (mentor of future Cleveland mayor Frank G. Jackson), Council Majority Leader Basil Russo began to speak. However, the mayor and his aides stormed out of Cleveland City Hall. The action was jeered by steelworker union members who attended the session in support of the ore dock project. "Keep on going," one of them shouted. Forbes attempted to restore order. "Let's be quiet while they walk out." Although Council approved the lease afterward, Republic Steel decided to leave the city and build its dock in nearby Lorain, Ohio.

== Recall drive ==
The Hongisto feud and Kucinich's ongoing conflicts with Council and the police fueled the recall drive. According to the Encyclopedia of Cleveland History, at first, recall petitions were "some 3,355 signatures short of the required 37,552 when first submitted in May." Proponents of the anti-Kucinich movement "had 20 more days to make up the difference, and on 1 June 5,321 additional signatures were obtained."

Although Kucinich challenged the validity of the signatures, Common Pleas Judge John Angelotta ruled against him. The Court of Appeals and the Ohio Supreme Court upheld Angelotta's ruling and a recall election date was set for August 13, the first Sunday election in local history. The mayor's response was "Bring on the recall!"

The Plain Dealer, The Cleveland Press, The Cleveland Call and Post, the Republican and Democratic parties, the AFL–CIO, and 24 of the 33 Council members urged the mayor's recall. Kucinich fought back with television commercials showing business leaders cutting up a cake shaped like Cleveland City Hall.

== Recall results ==
=== Polling ===
The results of a poll conducted by Urban Reports Corp. and Cleveland State University were published by The Cleveland Press in an article by Brent Larkin on August 1, 1978. It showed the following results:

Positions	White voters	African American voters
For recall	29.8%	38.1%
Against recall	50.3%	34.4%
Undecided	19.9%	27.5%

The outcome of this survey demonstrated the possibility of a Kucinich victory. Notably, the majority of those surveyed had voted for Kucinich in the 1977 mayoral election. These poll results would later reflect the outcome of the recall election on August 13.

=== Results ===
At first, the outcome of the election was uncertain. After a recount, the results were finally in. 60,014 votes were cast for recall and 60,250 against. Kucinich was able to retain his position by only 236 votes (a margin of less than 0.2 percent). He later thanked "God and the people of Cleveland for ignoring [his] imperfections and giving [his] administration another chance."
