= 1977 Cleveland mayoral election =

- November 8, 1977
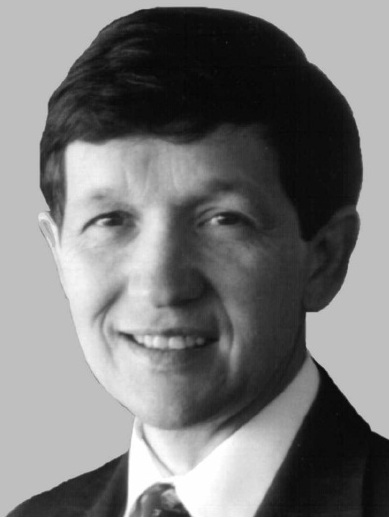

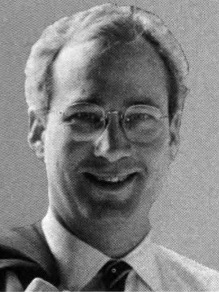
Candidate	Dennis Kucinich	Ed Feighan
Party	Nonpartisan	Nonpartisan
Popular vote	93,047	90,074
Percentage	50.81%	49.19%
Mayor before election
Ralph Perk
Republican
Elected mayor
Dennis Kucinich
Democratic

The 1977 Cleveland mayoral election took place on November 8, 1977, to elect the Mayor of Cleveland, Ohio. The election was won by Dennis Kucinich. The election was officially nonpartisan, with the top two candidates from the October 4 primary advancing to the general election.

In an upset defeat, incumbent mayor Ralph Perk failed to advance past the primary.

Kucinich, at 31 years of age, became the youngest mayor of a major United States city.

== Candidates ==
- Ed Feighan, Ohio State Representative
- Alyson Kennedy
- Dennis Kucinich, city council member
- Ralph Perk, incumbent Republican mayor

== Primary election ==
Primary election results
Candidate	Votes	%
Dennis Kucinich	40,003	34.09%
Ed Feighan	39,724	33.85%
Ralph Perk (incumbent)	36,389	31.01%
Alyson Kennedy	1,225	1.04%
Total votes	117,341	

== General election ==
Cleveland mayoral election, 1977
Candidate	Votes	%
Dennis Kucinich	93,047	50.81%
Ed Feighan	90,074	49.19%
Total votes	183,121	
