= List of killings by law enforcement officers in the United States in the 1930s =

This is a list of people reported killed by non-military law enforcement officers in the United States in the 20th century, whether in the line of duty or not, and regardless of reason or method. The listing documents the occurrence of a death, making no implications regarding wrongdoing or justification on the part of the person killed or officer involved. Killings are arranged by date of the incident that caused death. Different death dates, if known, are noted in the description. This page lists 159 people.

== 1930s ==
The table below lists 159 people.

Date	Name (age) of deceased	State (city)	Description
1939-12-10	Virgil Childers (38)	North Carolina (Shelby)	Childers was shot and killed while trying to escape from an officer.
1939-11-15	Louis F. Edwards. (47)	New York (Long Beach)	Edwards, the mayor of Long Beach, was assassinated by an officer who was the former head of the police union and a member of his own security detail.
1938-12-07	Leslie Harris	Florida (Eureka)	
1938-10-15	Joe Hodnett (24)	Virginia (Chatham)	Hodnett was killed by a state police officer while fleeing. He had been accused of stealing automobile licenses and a trailer.
1938-09-24	Dave Foots(34)	Arkansas (West Memphis)	Foots was beaten and shot by deputy sheriff Culp, but four other officers and a judge may have been involved. According to Foote's wife, Foote was targeted because he and Culp were interested in the same Black woman.
1938-08-09	Henry Davis	Georgia (Valdosta)	Davis was fatally shot by a police officer. He had been accused of wounding a white man.
1938-08-06	Fred Davis (22)	Tennessee (Memphis)	Davis was killed by a patrolman after allegedly throwing bricks at people and property.
1938-07-20	Willie McDonald (26)	Mississippi (Newton)	McDonald had allegedly attempted to enter a white family's home in only his underwear. Officers shot him while they were transporting him to jail after the event.
1939-07-08 (?)	Robert Mays (48)	Georgia (Brunswick)	
1938-06-17	Aaron Boyd (38)	Louisiana (New Orleans)	Boyd was killed in a police custody. While it's unclear exactly what happened, police claimed he had injured himself from "falling multiple times."
1938-05-13	Antoinette Modleiski (27)	New York (New York)	Patrolman Anthony Modieski shot and killed his wife and two of his children before fatally shooting himself. Another child was wounded, but survived.
1938-05-13	Joseph Modleiski (3)	New York (New York)	Patrolman Anthony Modieski shot and killed his wife and two of his children before fatally shooting himself. Another child was wounded, but survived.
1938-05-13	William Modleiski (1)	New York (New York)	Patrolman Anthony Modieski shot and killed his wife and two of his children before fatally shooting himself. Another child was wounded, but survived.
1938-05-11	Mack Josey	Georgia (Macon)	
1938-02-27	Leroy Johnson (24)	Florida (Miami)	Johnson drowned after being chased by two policemen into a canal.
1938-02-06	Wilbert Jackson (22)	Florida (Liberty Point)	Jackson was shot by a drunk sheriff.
1938-01-03	George Brooks (26)	Tennessee (Memphis)	
1937-12-04	John Johnson (33)	Florida (Miami)	Police officer Simpson fatally shot Johnson inside his apartment building, claiming he had a gun.
1937-11-25	Charles Anderson (17)	Louisiana (New Orleans)	
1937-11-10	Jesse Turner (25)	Mississippi (Coahoma)	
1937-10-17	J.O. Moses	Florida (St. Petersburg)	
1937-10-10	Archie Muse (39)	Virginia (Pocahontas)	
1937-09-08	Melvin Santiel (20)	Mississippi (Leflore County)	
1937-09-03	William Kirby	Georgia (Cedar Grove)	
1937-07-27	Stafford Dames (19)	Florida (Miami)	
1937-07-18	Edward Chinn (33)	Louisiana (New Orleans)	
1937-07-11	Frederick O'Neale (16)	Florida (Jacksonville)	O'Neale, a student and Sunday school teacher, was killed by an officer on a golf course. He may have been tortured before being killed.
1937-05-30	Hilding Anderson (27)	Illinois (Chicago)	1937 Memorial Day massacre. 10 unarmed demonstrators were shot and killed by members of the Chicago Police Department. 67 or more were injured.
1937-05-30	Alfred Causey (43)	Illinois (Chicago)	1937 Memorial Day massacre. 10 unarmed demonstrators were shot and killed by members of the Chicago Police Department. 67 or more were injured.
1937-05-30	Leo Francisco (17)	Illinois (Chicago)	1937 Memorial Day massacre. 10 unarmed demonstrators were shot and killed by members of the Chicago Police Department. 67 or more were injured.
1937-05-30	Earl Handley (37)	Illinois (Chicago)	1937 Memorial Day massacre. 10 unarmed demonstrators were shot and killed by members of the Chicago Police Department. 67 or more were injured.
1937-05-30	Otis Jones (33)	Illinois (Chicago)	1937 Memorial Day massacre. 10 unarmed demonstrators were shot and killed by members of the Chicago Police Department. 67 or more were injured.
1937-05-30	Sam Popovich (45)	Illinois (Chicago)	1937 Memorial Day massacre. 10 unarmed demonstrators were shot and killed by members of the Chicago Police Department. 67 or more were injured.
1937-05-30	Kenneth Reed (23)	Illinois (Chicago)	1937 Memorial Day massacre. 10 unarmed demonstrators were shot and killed by members of the Chicago Police Department. 67 or more were injured.
1937-05-30	Joseph Rothmund (48)	Illinois (Chicago)	1937 Memorial Day massacre. 10 unarmed demonstrators were shot and killed by members of the Chicago Police Department. 67 or more were injured.
1937-05-30	Anthony Tagliori (26)	Illinois (Chicago)	1937 Memorial Day massacre. 10 unarmed demonstrators were shot and killed by members of the Chicago Police Department. 67 or more were injured.
1937-05-30	Lee Tisdale (50)	Illinois (Chicago)	1937 Memorial Day massacre. 10 unarmed demonstrators were shot and killed by members of the Chicago Police Department. 67 or more were injured.
1937-05-25	Willie Reed (24)	Georgia (Albany)	
1937-05-06	John Brown (37)	Texas (Otey)	
1937-05-03	Helen Burkhard (20)	California (San Francisco)	
1937-05-03	Marion Burkhard (20)	California (San Francisco)	
1937-05-03	Mrs. Burkhard (45)	California (San Francisco)	
1937-05-01	Earley Bird Hamilton	Arkansas (Hazen)	
1937-03-21	Cotal Nieves, Juan Delgado	Puerto Rico (Ponce)	About 18 unarmed civilians peacefully protesting the U.S. government were killed by police in the Ponce massacre. Two policemen were killed by friendly fire, and hundreds of civilians were wounded in this terrorist attack.
1937-03-21	Maria Hernández del Rosario	Puerto Rico (Ponce)	About 18 unarmed civilians peacefully protesting the U.S. government were killed by police in the Ponce massacre. Two policemen were killed by friendly fire, and hundreds of civilians were wounded in this terrorist attack.
1937-03-21	Luis Jimenez Morales	Puerto Rico (Ponce)	About 18 unarmed civilians peacefully protesting the U.S. government were killed by police in the Ponce massacre. Two policemen were killed by friendly fire, and hundreds of civilians were wounded in this terrorist attack.
1937-03-21	Ceferino Loyola Pérez	Puerto Rico (Ponce)	About 18 unarmed civilians peacefully protesting the U.S. government were killed by police in the Ponce massacre. Two policemen were killed by friendly fire, and hundreds of civilians were wounded in this terrorist attack.
1937-03-21	Georgina Maldonado	Puerto Rico (Ponce)	About 18 unarmed civilians peacefully protesting the U.S. government were killed by police in the Ponce massacre. Two policemen were killed by friendly fire, and hundreds of civilians were wounded in this terrorist attack.
1937-03-21	Bolivar Márquez Telechea	Puerto Rico (Ponce)	About 18 unarmed civilians peacefully protesting the U.S. government were killed by police in the Ponce massacre. Two policemen were killed by friendly fire, and hundreds of civilians were wounded in this terrorist attack.
1937-03-21	Ramon Ortiz Toro	Puerto Rico (Ponce)	About 18 unarmed civilians peacefully protesting the U.S. government were killed by police in the Ponce massacre. Two policemen were killed by friendly fire, and hundreds of civilians were wounded in this terrorist attack.
1937-03-21	Ulpiano Perea	Puerto Rico (Ponce)	About 18 unarmed civilians peacefully protesting the U.S. government were killed by police in the Ponce massacre. Two policemen were killed by friendly fire, and hundreds of civilians were wounded in this terrorist attack.
1937-03-21	Juan Antonio Pietrantoni	Puerto Rico (Ponce)	About 18 unarmed civilians peacefully protesting the U.S. government were killed by police in the Ponce massacre. Two policemen were killed by friendly fire, and hundreds of civilians were wounded in this terrorist attack.
1937-03-21	Juan Reyes Rivera	Puerto Rico (Ponce)	About 18 unarmed civilians peacefully protesting the U.S. government were killed by police in the Ponce massacre. Two policemen were killed by friendly fire, and hundreds of civilians were wounded in this terrorist attack.
1937-03-21	Conrado Rivera Lopez	Puerto Rico (Ponce)	About 18 unarmed civilians peacefully protesting the U.S. government were killed by police in the Ponce massacre. Two policemen were killed by friendly fire, and hundreds of civilians were wounded in this terrorist attack.
1937-03-21	Iván G. Rodriguez Figueras	Puerto Rico (Ponce)	About 18 unarmed civilians peacefully protesting the U.S. government were killed by police in the Ponce massacre. Two policemen were killed by friendly fire, and hundreds of civilians were wounded in this terrorist attack.
1937-03-21	Jenaro Rodriguez Mendez	Puerto Rico (Ponce)	About 18 unarmed civilians peacefully protesting the U.S. government were killed by police in the Ponce massacre. Two policemen were killed by friendly fire, and hundreds of civilians were wounded in this terrorist attack.
1937-03-21	Pedro Juan Rodriguez Rivera	Puerto Rico (Ponce)	About 18 unarmed civilians peacefully protesting the U.S. government were killed by police in the Ponce massacre. Two policemen were killed by friendly fire, and hundreds of civilians were wounded in this terrorist attack.
1937-03-21	Obdulio Rosario	Puerto Rico (Ponce)	About 18 unarmed civilians peacefully protesting the U.S. government were killed by police in the Ponce massacre. Two policemen were killed by friendly fire, and hundreds of civilians were wounded in this terrorist attack.
1937-03-21	Eusebio Sánchez Pérez	Puerto Rico (Ponce)	About 18 unarmed civilians peacefully protesting the U.S. government were killed by police in the Ponce massacre. Two policemen were killed by friendly fire, and hundreds of civilians were wounded in this terrorist attack.
1937-03-21	Juan Santos Ortiz	Puerto Rico (Ponce)	About 18 unarmed civilians peacefully protesting the U.S. government were killed by police in the Ponce massacre. Two policemen were killed by friendly fire, and hundreds of civilians were wounded in this terrorist attack.
1937-03-21	Juan Torres Gregory	Puerto Rico (Ponce)	About 18 unarmed civilians peacefully protesting the U.S. government were killed by police in the Ponce massacre. Two policemen were killed by friendly fire, and hundreds of civilians were wounded in this terrorist attack.
1937-03-21	Teodoro Velez Torres	Puerto Rico (Ponce)	About 18 unarmed civilians peacefully protesting the U.S. government were killed by police in the Ponce massacre. Two policemen were killed by friendly fire, and hundreds of civilians were wounded in this terrorist attack.
1937-02-01	Wesley Johnson (19)	Alabama (Tumbleton)	
1936-12-26	Mack Jiles (28)	Louisiana (Gretna)	Mack Jiles, a Black laborer, was killed by Chief of Police Beauregard Miller. Miller claimed that Jiles robbed his home and, upon arrest, tried to escape. Miller fatally shot Jiles in the head.
1936-10-04	Dennie Thrower	North Carolina (Bertie County)	Dennie Thrower, a Black public worker, was killed by police after a six-hour siege at Thrower's home.
1936-09-12	Thomas Finch (28)	Georgia (Atlanta)	Thomas Finch, a Black hospital orderly, was killed by Detective S. W. Roper at a police station.
1936-08-18	Joseph Qualteri (46)	Colorado (Englewood)	Joseph Qualteri, an ex-convict who had escaped from a state hospital for the insane, was killed by deputy police chief L. A. Jordan. Qualteri had opened fire on Jordan while resisting a search.
1936-07-14	Nick Boblovich (60)	California (Los Angeles)	
1936-07-01	Charles Evans (50)	Arkansas (Sebastian County)	Charles Evans, a Black preacher, was killed by a mob of police officers and citizens for having "too much religious zeal."
1936-05-15	Cora Wales (50)	Virginia (Madison)	Cora Wales, a Black woman, was killed by a police-backed mob. She and her brother William were shot and burned in their home.
1936-05-15	William Wales (43)	Virginia (Madison)	William Wales, a Black man, was killed by a police-backed mob. He and his sister Cora were shot and burned in their home.
1936-04-14	Charles Teel (23)	Texas (Brazoria County)	Charles Teel, a Black man, was killed by prison guards at Texas State prison while allegedly attempting to escape from custody.
1936-02-10	Dick Taylor (35)	Florida (Seminole)	
1936-01-17	Mayse Grace (42)	Texas (Panola County)	Mayse Grey, a Black farmer, was killed by police while on parole for a DUI. He had barricaded himself inside his home and allegedly fired at officers. His father was also killed by police years earlier.
1935-11-01	Dave Hart (22)	Louisiana (Gretna)	Dave Hart, a Black man, was shot and killed by deputy sheriffs while in jail.
1935-11-01	Henry Buddy Freeman (24)	Louisiana (Gretna)	Henry Buddy Freeman, a Black man, was shot and killed by deputy sheriffs while in jail.
1935-09-14	Timothy Curran (26)	New York (New York)	
1935-04-10	Willie Jackson (25)	South Carolina (Kershaw County)	Willie Jackson, a Black laborer, was killed by a police posse after a group of prisoners, including Jackson, escaped from the state prison.
1935-04-10	Frasier Lyle	South Carolina (Kershaw County)	Frasier Lyle, a Black laborer, was killed by a police posse after a group of prisoners, including Lyle, escaped from the state prison.
1935-04-10	Carnell Williams (25)	South Carolina (Kershaw County)	Carnell Williams, a Black laborer, was killed by a police posse after a group of prisoners, including Williams, escaped from the state prison.
1934-07-21	John Dillinger (31)	Illinois (Chicago)	Infamous bank robber John Dillinger was shot and killed by Bureau of Investigation agents as he attempted to flee the Biograph Theater in Chicago.
1934-07-21	Moise Wilson (27)	Louisiana (Franklinton)	Moise Wilson, a Black farmer, was shot by Deputy Sheriff Delos C. Wood. Wilson died in police custody from his injuries after being refused medical attention.
1934-07-08	Melvin Randolph (23)	Tennessee (Memphis)	Melvin Randolph, a Black farmer, was fatally shot by Sheriff W.C. Hayes while in police custody.
1934-05-23	Bonnie Parker (23)	Louisiana (Shreveport)	Bonnie and Clyde
1934-05-23	Clyde Barrow (25)	Louisiana (Shreveport)	Bonnie and Clyde
1934-05-11	Pierre Sylve (67)	Louisiana (Plaquemines)	Pierre E Sylve, a Black farmer, was killed by a heavily armed posse of police and citizens. He died "in a hailstorm of bullets."
1934-05-08	Frank Pojman (55)	Ohio (Cleveland)	Pojman was arrested by two Cleveland Police patrolmen for alleged intoxication (which the coroner later disproved). En route to the police station, the patrolmen assaulted Pojman and he suffered a fractured skull and later died from his injuries.
1934-04-27	Wanda Stewart	California (Victorville)	
1934-04-27	Walter Wyeth	California (Victorville)	
1933-12-07	David Gregory (25)	Texas (Kountze)	David Gregory, a Black man, was killed by a law enforcement posse for allegedly resisting arrest. His body was mutilated and burned.
1933-11-19	Will Walker (55)	Georgia (Jefferson County)	Will Walker, a Black farmer, was shot to death by a police officer after he allegedly resisted arrest.
1933-11-14	Mack Lesley (30)	Louisiana (Farmville)	Mack Lesley, a Black farmer, was killed by Deputies O. McElroy and Raymond Meeks. Lesley had been accused of involvement with a "secret organization that was planning the uprising of Black citizens."
1933-11-13	Russel Hughes (35)	Illinois (Peoria)	
1933-11-09	Ralph Koen (29)	Tennessee (Memphis)	
1933-08-23	Glover Davis (40)	Georgia (Atlanta)	Glover Davis, a blind Black man, was shot and killed by police officer O. W. Allen. Allen claimed Davis advanced on him with an ice pick.
1933-08-13	James Pruitt	Alabama (Tuscaloosa County)	James Pruitt, a Black farm worker, was shot to death by police officers Harley Holeman and R. M. Pate.
1933-06-18	Shelton West (21)	Michigan (Detroit)	
1933-06-14	Jesse Bray (42)	Georgia (Atlanta)	Jesse Bray, a Black painter, was shot and killed by police officers M.V. Moss and E.P. Roberts.
1933-05-23	W. S. Lovell (17)	Texas (Panola County)	Lovell, a Black teenage boy, was cornered and killed by police officers and a large mob for allegedly attacking a white woman.
1933-05-22	Duffy Barksdale	South Carolina (Clinton)	Duffy Barksdale, a Black tenant farmer, was fatally shot by officer Caldwell Weir and another man in front of Barksdale's two sons.
1933-03-17	Cleve Horton (29)	Georgia (Atlanta)	Horton, a Black bus boy, was beaten, shot, and killed by patrolman Roy Eddleman in the restaurant bathroom.
1933-03-16	Fox Bates (55)	Tennessee (Smithville)	
1933-02-25	Levon Carlock (19)	Tennessee (Memphis)	Carlock, a Black man, was beaten, tortured, and shot to death by six police officers.
1933-02-15	John West (26)	Oklahoma (Malester)	
1933-02-09	Walter Mills (25)	Georgia (Atlanta)	Walter Mills, a Black laborer, was killed by patrolmen E.D. Ellison and M.V. Mose, who claimed Mills and another Black man were robbing a grocery store.
1933-01-26	Robert Richardson (19)	Louisiana (Baton Rouge)	Richardson, a Black man, allegedly "annoyed a white woman" and was shot to death in his home by a mob led by the sheriff.
1932-12-31	Edna Davis (21)	Alabama (Birmingham)	Edna Davis, a Black woman, was shot and killed by police officers Charles Norell and John W. Allen and detective J. T. Moser. Police were investigating a burglary and claimed they shot Davis as she was "resisting arrest."
1932-12-25	Toby Glymph (32)	Florida (Oakland)	Glymph was handcuffed and taken from his home, then shot by a police officer
1932-10-17	Estella Strickling (25)	Georgia (Moreland)	
1932-10-17	Denna Strickling (52)	Georgia (Moreland)	
1932-10-08	Willie Wright	Georgia (Atlanta)	
1932-09-05	William Brawner	Georgia (Atlanta)	
1932-09-04	Luther Battle	Georgia (Atlanta)	
1932-08-20	Leonard Ward	Alabama (Birmingham)	
1932-07-16	Ernest Wray (19)	Georgia (Atlanta)	
1932-04-24	Lawrance Goodwell (15)	Georgia (Atlanta)	
1932-04-16	Jess Whittinghill (40)	Kentucky (Princeton)	
1932-04-15	Allen Humble (34)	Oklahoma (Earlsboro)	
1932-03-16	Harold White (16)	Georgia (Atlanta)	Harold White, a Black laborer, was killed by detective Frank C. Foster during the hold-up of a delicatessen.
1932-02-10	Robert Smith (35)	Georgia (Atlanta)	
1932-01-18	George Alexander (36)	Georgia (Decatur)	
1932-01-16	Charlie Jackson	Georgia (Atlanta)	Jackson was killed in his home by a police posse led by officer H.H. Ramsaur.
1931-12-27	Wiley Cook	Georgia (Atlanta)	
1931-12-26	Robert Lee	Georgia (Atlanta)	Lee was shot by a police officer after allegedly pulling a knife.
1931-12-13	Robert Nelson	Georgia (Atlanta)	Nelson was shot by police when fleeing his car after a crash.
1931-12-01	John Stokes	Georgia (East Point)	Stokes was killed by a posse of police.
1931-11-25	Raymond Morris (21)	Alabama (Bessemer)	
1931-11-17	George Price	Florida (McDavid)	After being arrested, Price allegedly shot and wounded an officer, who then shot and killed him
1931-10-05	Lawrence Reid (20)	Alabama (Bessemer)	
1931-07-16	Ralph Gray	Alabama (Camp Hill)	Sheriff Kyle Young shot into a union strike, where Gray was picketing. Gray escaped and went home, but a police posse broke into his house and shot him to death.
1931-06-24	M. C. Pitts	Georgia (Atlanta)	
1931-04-15	Randell Butler (32)	Florida (Jacksonville)	
1931-03-01	Robert Hill	Florida (Live Oak)	
1931-02-16	Noah Lamb (25)	Kentucky (Lexington)	
1931-02-16	John Martin (25)	Kentucky (Lexington)	
1931-02-13	George Spann (30)	Mississippi (Blaine)	
1931-02-12	David Titsworth	Arkansas (Pine Bluff)	
1931-02-04	Garfield Hunter	North Carolina (Henderson)	
1931-01-17	Leman McDaniel	Louisiana (Shreveport)	
1930-11-26	Unnamed man	Ohio (Columbus)	
1930-10-23	Joseph Piteo (32)	Pennsylvania (Philadelphia)	
1930-09-08	William Henry Bryant (25)	Georgia (Darien)	
1930-08-07	George Robinson (28)	Mississippi (Raymond)	
1930-08-06	Herbert Richardson	Texas (Texarkana)	
1930-08-05	Milton Strickland (37)	Tennessee (Chattanooga)	
1930-08-04	Aivia Carter a.k.a. Frank Scott (34)	Iowa (Sac City)	
1930-06-27	Sol H. Barnett (24)	Ohio (Middletown)	
1930-06-21	Unnamed Black man	Illinois (Chicago)	
1930-05-22	William Carps (16)	Michigan (Detroit)	
1930-05-16	George Johnson (30)	Texas (Honey Grove)	
1930-05-08	George Barrow (25)	North Carolina (Belhaven)	
1930-03-23	Henry Pistrowski	New York (Buffalo)	
1930-03-23	John Dzazdzynsku	New York (Buffalo)	
1930-03-23	Edward Domkiewicz	New York (Buffalo)	
1930-03-23	Walter Krajewski	New York (Buffalo)	
1930-02-10	McCray, Hattie (14)	Louisiana (New Orleans)	
1930-01-14	Unnamed man	Illinois (Chicago)	
1930-01-14	Unnamed man	Illinois (Chicago)	
1930-01-06	Robert Simpson	Texas (Beaumont)	
