= Civilian oversight of law enforcement =

Board of civilians that scrutinize government activities

Civilian oversight, sometimes referred to as civilian review or citizen oversight, is a form of civilian participation in reviewing government activities, most commonly accusations of police misconduct. Members of civilian oversight boards (variously known as civilian review boards, civilian police oversight agencies, citizen review boards or similar) are generally not employed by the government entity which they are reviewing. These groups are tasked with direct involvement in the citizen complaints process and develop solutions to improve government accountability. Responsibilities of civilian oversight groups can vary significantly depending on the jurisdiction and their ability to become influential. Oversight should not simply criticize but should improve government through citizen support for government responsiveness, accountability, transparency, and overall efficiency.

Proactive civilian oversight improves transparency and demands accountability at all levels of government. Reporting and monitoring (financial records, performance measures, and open records,... etc.) are now regarded as fundamental governance responsibilities. Citizen Advisory Boards are a way for civilians to be involved in government oversight. Other forms of government oversight include citizen committees, community panels, citizen juries, public participation, negotiated rulemaking, and mediation

An effective civilian oversight committee is structured to take on the following responsibilities: create processes for risk governance, monitoring and reporting; create clear defined duties to improve effectiveness and avoid overlapping work; recruit/retain members that are knowledgeable and engaged about policy; develop critiques that result in improved service outcomes; assign oversight responsibilities to designated individuals or groups for specific government functions; and reviews rolls regularly.

Civilian oversight boards brainstorm ideas to improve transparency and create policy proposals. Most proposals regarding civilian oversight have been with respects to police activities, healthcare, non-profit and private sector.

== Definition and scope ==
According to the National Association for Civilian Oversight of Law Enforcement (NACOLE):

"Sometimes referred to as citizen oversight, civilian review, external review and citizen review boards (Walker 2001; Alpert et al. 2016), this form of police accountability is often focused on allowing non-police actors to provide input into the police department's operations, often with a focus on the citizen complaint process. In some jurisdictions, this is sometimes accomplished by allowing oversight practitioners (both paid and volunteer) to review, audit or monitor complaint investigations that were conducted by police internal affairs investigators. In other jurisdictions, it is done by allowing civilians to conduct independent investigations of allegations of misconduct lodged against sworn law enforcement officers. It can also be accomplished through the creation of mechanisms that are authorized to review and comment on police policies, practices, training and systemic conduct. Some oversight mechanisms involve a combination of systemic analysis and complaint handling or review."

== Change in political attitude ==
Civilian oversight is the result of a profound change in public attitudes toward government particularly related to trust. There is a lack of trust between communities and government/business because of historical misconduct. Misconduct included racial discrimination during the civil rights era, illegal activities during the Watergate scandal, and more recently the general public disagreement with government bailouts and financial fraud like Enron scandal. All these actions have caused an increased demand in accountability. Trust is a measured by gauging how effective ordinary civilians feel local policies and authorities are in their duties as official. A series of laws have been created indicating the growing public concern about the need for oversight of government agencies.

In the 21st century, the trend towards providing legislative oversight over intelligence services and their activities has been a growing phenomenon. Scandals and new laws in the ever-changing political situation over the last twenty years have made it a necessity for Legislative oversight over problematic intelligence and security programs. Resulting in a clear push towards reigning in government agencies overstepping their boundaries and made civilian oversight a requirement over national security and law enforcement.

== Forms ==
Contemporary forms of Civilian Oversight Agencies are often varied due a large degree of variance between the backgrounds of such jurisdictions. Each Agency may vary due to specific social and cultural issues unique to that location. Despite this, there are typically three overarching forms of Civilian Oversight Agencies. They are: Investigation-Focused Models, Review-Focused Models, and Auditor/monitor-focused models.

=== Investigation-focused models ===
Generally, this form of oversight agency is separate from the district's local police division. They operate by investigating reports of misconduct of police officers in their jurisdiction. The benefits of running an investigation-focused model agency is that they can complete thorough and impartial investigations into police conduct with a minimal degree of bias. It is common for those running these agencies to have a significant degree of training as to not improperly diagnose an investigation.

Further, these models heavily involve the citizens of the district they are representing. Thus, the operations of the investigation are transparent and this increases community trust in the operations of both the civilian oversight agency and the police department under which they reside. Another advantage to this model is the fact that it allows (more than others) for hiring of full-time staff to conduct the investigation - resulting in a more thorough analysis.

The negatives of this form are related to the significant costs of operation. This plays out largely in the costs of staffing full-time individuals to conduct investigations.

=== Review-focused models ===
This category of oversight agencies are focused on reviewing the quality of internal investigations and especially those conducted by internal police-run oversight agencies. These are often entirely voluntary organization, unlike the Investigation-Focused models where there are often full-time investigators on the oversight agency. They are often focused on providing community input into the police investigation process to ensure that the community that the police have jurisdiction over has a voice.

The operations that a review-focused agency often implement are: to take in community complaints, review the police investigations of complaints from the community, make community recommendations to high level police directors, listen to community appeals, and to obtain and analyze community input.

The strengths of this model are that it may seem like these sorts of agencies are more transparent to the community that ones with full-time investigators. Further, it allows for community input into police-ran investigations, which can help in analyzing appropriate conduct for officers. Finally, they are also the least expensive option for oversight agencies since they are entirely volunteer run. Thus, they are more popular in areas with fewer funds to allocate.

The limitations of this sort of agency are that they tend to have a more limited authority over the conduct of police agencies. Further, they may be less independent from other oversight agencies since they rely heavily on the police department for information. Finally, due to a lack of funding, the members of these agencies are likely to have less training and ability to complete oversight into a police department effectively.

=== Auditor/monitor-focused models ===
Finally, Auditor/Monitor-Focused models tend to be affecting systemic, large-scale reform to the police agencies within their jurisdiction. This is also one of the newest forms of citizen oversight and it tends to have a unique set of goals that distinguish it from other oversight agencies. These goals are: to monitor the internal complaint investigations process, to conduct evaluations of police training and codes of conduct, and to ensure effective public reporting.

One of the strengths of this sort of organization is that these agencies may have a broader access to critical information about police officer conduct and training. This allows for a deeper understanding of how to reform such an agency. Further, auditor and monitors of such agencies are likely to be experts in policing, allowing for a deeper fix than the other agencies. It is also likely that these agencies will conduct more change than superficial ones enacted by Investigation-Focused and Review-Focused Models. This would be because they are tackling the roots of what may cause poor police officer conduct and that it can also hold officers more accountable.

The limitations of such an agency would include a relative lack of community support for such an organization. This would stem from the fact that members of such a committee would be full-time, paid individuals and so may not "represent the community". Further, since a long-term systemic change is desired, compromises in individual cases may be made for the sake of systemic change. This may result in community backlash. Further, this form of citizen oversight can only make recommendations to law enforcement and cannot enforce changes onto them. Finally, the effectiveness of such an agency would depend heavily on the quality of individuals hired to do the task - more so than other oversight agencies. This is because ensuring a systemic change requires a high degree of technical sophistication and training to ensure effective outcomes.

== Challenges ==
- Hostility, resistance, and obstruction by rank-and-file police officers, police department leaders, and police unions.
- An inadequate framework by which to hold officers accountable.
- The ability of police departments to routinely ignore recommendations made by civilian review agencies.
- Inadequate access to resources (funding, access to case information, etc.)

45% of oversight agencies do not have enabling statues/ordinances that explicitly require that Law Enforcement Employees Cooperate with their agency. A further 69% do not have enabling statues/ordinances which require police officers/command staff cooperate as a condition of their employment. This allows lack of accountability on the hands of the police allows for obstruction of investigations and reviews by oversight agencies. 54% of oversight agencies reported that police officials did not implement their recommendations very frequently/frequently.

Only 6% of oversight agencies are able to impose discipline on the police departments and officers they oversee. This lack of authority allows for police departments to ignore important recommendations made by oversight agencies. It can sometimes appear that explicit cooperation is provided to civilian oversight agencies by police departments along with respect for the legitimacy of the oversight agency, while at the same time a subtle and persistent push back exists to minimize the impact of oversight agencies. The intention of this push back is to cause the citizens to lose faith in the oversight agency's effectiveness or to have elected officials question the investment in the oversight agency and ultimately cause them to lose their funding.

== Benefits and weaknesses ==
Benefit Increased focus on monitoring, reporting, strategic advising, value creation, accountability, and the creation of professional standards.

Civilian oversight serves as a benefit to the citizens as it promotes a willingness of organizations subjected to be more open to engagement. Shifting towards engaging with the people being served and more attention towards accountability opens new avenues of service delivery. Organizations that can be made to submit to oversight of the population being served allows for changes that would benefit the population.

Weakness or setbacks Accountability, transparency, and reporting are important to citizen oversight. Acts like Patient Protection and Affordable Care Act have caused an increase in oversight responsibilities requiring increased reporting, extensive examination of performance, and increased accountability of internal citizen oversight. Oversight can be excessive and ultimately detrimental to desirable outcomes, and administrators spend a significant amount of time on monitoring and less on strategies. Difficulty forming citizen groups, failing to function effectively, agency role is not visible enough or influential, group is abolished altogether.

== International ==
Civilian participation and accountability initiatives have become a common practice in democratic nations. Reporting and monitoring results are now regarded as fundamental governance responsibilities The growth of civilian oversight is not confined to the United States. Citizen oversight (particularly for the police) is universal and has expanded across the English-speaking world and is spreading in Latin America, Asia, and continental Europe International Asian countries do not look at service-oriented policing like western countries. Asian democracies focus on defense and maintenance of established rules, reviewing and monitoring government actions and policing human rights violations, police corruption, and corporate management. Research in the United Kingdom has noted the importance of oversight of state functions such as prisons to ensure the fair and humane detention of vulnerable persons such as prisoners.

Hong Kong's civilian oversight is considered to be far more transparent, independent, sufficient at holding government accountable. Possibly a result of being largely more democratic, than countries like China. Nearly all Asian democracies have some form of oversight, but only 3 have civilian oversight.

== United States ==
The first recorded forms of civilian oversight took the form of police commissions in the late 19th and early 20th centuries, by Progressive Era reformers. They were initially begun to decrease the influence of politicians on local police forces. This ultimately failed, as politicians infiltrated these commissions, though they had little expertise in the field of policing.

After the failed police commissions, civilian oversight was revolutionized, and had its beginnings in large cities such as Washington D.C., Philadelphia, and New York City. This started due to turmoil between African Americans and police in the early 1900s, and also failed, because these review boards were under-resourced, and performed not much beyond receiving and reviewing complaints about misconduct against police officers. Ultimately, the resistance faced by the police force, and the lack of resources caused these review boards to be disbanded and abolished.

In the 1960s, another wave of civilian oversight began. One of these agencies included the Public Review Commission, and the Office of Citizen Complaints. These boards were also created out of the turmoil between African Americans and the police, except this was during the Civil Rights Era, where these clashes arguably climaxed. What separated these civilian oversight boards from their ancestors was that this type of board utilized other agencies to investigate police misconduct. They also had more enhanced resources, more authority, and more durability.

Though the Civil Rights Era civilian oversight boards were not failures, there were advancements to these boards in the 1990s, up to the present day. The number of civilian oversight committees rapidly increased after the videotaped beating of Rodney King by the officers of the Los Angeles Police Department in 1991. Most of these agencies and committees were focused on reviewing reported police activities. However, this era created the first police auditors, such as the San Jose Police Auditor, and the Special Counsel for the Los Angeles County Board of Supervisors, in 1993. Many of these auditors and review boards even combined into one stronger entity during this period. There were reportedly less than 40 civilian oversight agencies in 1990, over 100 by 2001, and 144 as of 2016, according to the National Association for Civilian Oversight of Law Enforcement. To date, the Bad Apple Oversight Commission Database puts the total number of verified oversight commissions in the United States close to 200.

The table below is predominantly related to police oversight between 1920 and 1980. By 1980 there were about 13 agencies, and by 2000 more than 100 such as the Independent Police Auditor (IPA) in San Jose, California and Seattle, Washington and the Office of Independent Review (OIR) in New York City, New York.

Year, Location	Organization	Responsibilities
1925, Los Angeles, California	Committee on Constitutional Rights	Los Angeles Bar Association created a Committee on Constitutional Rights to receive complaints about police misconduct.
1931, Nationwide	National Commission on Law Observance and Enforcement	U.S. President Herbert Hoover established the National Commission on Law Observance and Enforcement, better known as the Wickersham Commission report on Lawlessness in Law Enforcement recommended creating "some disinterested agency" in each city to help people who had complaints about the police.
1935, New York City, New York	Harlem citizens task force	New York City, a mayor's task force recommended a committee of from five to seven Harlem citizens of both races to whom people may make complaint if mistreated by the police.
1948, Washington, D.C.	Complaint Review Board (CRB)	The first official civilian review board the historically significant innovation, the Complaint Review Board (CRB) was extremely weak and ineffectual.
1958, Philadelphia	Police Advisory Board (PAB)	The Police Advisory Board (PAB) consisted of a board of citizens who would receive citizen complaints, refer them to the police department for investigation, and then make a recommendation to the police commissioner for action after reviewing the police investigative file.
1960, Nationwide	various organizations	the movement for citizen oversight expanded significantly civil rights movement challenged police misconduct nationwide.
1966, New York City	expanded Civilian Complaint Review Board (CCRB)	Mayor John Lindsay expanded the existing Civilian Complaint Review Board (CCRB; created in 1953 as a purely internal procedure) to include four non-police members, giving it a 4–3 civilian majority.
1970s, Kansas City, Missouri	Office of Citizen Complaints	Monitored and responded to Citizen Complaints about government misconduct.
1973, Berkeley, California	Police Review Commission (PRC)	The first oversight agency with independent authority to investigate complaints and Detroit voters created the Board of Police Commissioners (BPC) to govern the police department, and the board established a complaint review process staffed by non-sworn investigators.
1995, Nationwide	National Association for Civilian Oversight of Law Enforcement	National Association for Civilian Oversight of Law Enforcement (NACOLE) was established.

=== US list ===
The following US are among those with civilian oversight.

City	Agency Title	Official Website
Akron, OH	Independent Police Auditor	
Albuquerque, NM	Civilian Police Oversight Agency	
Anaheim, CA	Police Review Board	
Asheville, NC	Citizens/Police Advisory Committee	
Athens-Clarke County, GA	Oversight Committee	
Atlanta, GA	Atlanta Citizen Review Board	
Austin, TX	Office of Police Oversight	
Baltimore, MD	Independent Monitor Team	
Berkeley, CA	Police Review Commission	
Boise, ID	Office of Police Oversight	
Boston, MA	Community Ombudsman Oversight Panel	
Brattleboro, VT	Citizen Police Communications Committee	
Buffalo, NY	Commission on Citizens' Rights and Community Relations	
Cambridge, MA	Police Review & Advisory Board	
Chandler, AZ	Citizens' Panel for Review of Police Complaints and Use of Force	
Charlotte, NC	Citizen Review Board	
Chicago, IL	Chicago Police Board	
Cincinnati, OH	Citizen Complaint Authority	
Cleveland, OH	Office of Professional Standards, Civilian Police Review Board, Cleveland Community Police Commission	
Columbia, MO	Citizens Police Review Board	
Davis, CA	Professional Standards Division	
Davis, CA	University of California, Davis Police Accountability Board	
Dayton, OH	Human Relations Council	
Denver, CO	Office of the Independent Monitor	
Detroit, MI	Board Of Police Commissioners	
Durham, NC	Civilian Police Review Board	
Eugene, OR	The Police Commission	
Fairfax, VA	Police Civilian Review Panel	
Fort Collins, CO	Citizen Review Board	
Greensboro, NC	Police Community Review Board	
Honolulu, HI	Honolulu Police Commission	
Houston, TX	Independent Police Oversight Board	
Indianapolis, IN	Citizens' Police Complaint Office	
Kansas City, MO	Office of Community Complaints	
Kauai, HI	Department of Human Resources	
Las Vegas, NV	Citizen Review Board	
Lincoln, NE	Citizen Police Advisory Board	
Los Angeles, CA	Los Angeles Board of Police Commissioners	
Los Angeles County, CA	Los Angeles County Civilian Oversight Commission	
Memphis, TN	Memphis Civilian Law Enforcement Review Board	
Miami, FL	Civilian investigative Panel	
Milwaukee, WI	Fire and Police Commission	
Minneapolis, MN	Office of Police Conduct Review	
Muskegon, MI	Citizen's Police Review Board	
Nashville, TN	Community Oversight Board (proposed in 2018)	
Newburgh, NY	Police-Community Relations and Review Board	
New York, NY	New York City Civilian Complaint Review Board	
Novato, CA	Police Advisory and Review Board	
Olathe, KS	Citizens Police Advisory Council	
Philadelphia, PA	Police Advisory Commission	
Phoenix, AZ	Disciplinary Review Board	
Pittsburgh, PA	Citizen Police Review Board	
Portland, ME	Police Citizen Review Subcommittee	
Richmond, CA	Citizens Police Review Commission	
Richmond, VA	Civilian Review Board	
Riverside, CA	Community Police Review Commission	
Sacramento, CA	Office of Police Accountability	
St. Cloud, MN	Police Citizens' Review Board	
St. Louis, MO	Civilian Oversight Board	
St. Paul, MN	Police Civilian Internal Affairs Review Commission	
Salt Lake City, UT	Police Civilian Review Board	
San Francisco, CA	Department of Police Accountability	
San Diego, CA	Commission on Police Practices	
San Jose, CA	Office of the Independent Police Auditor	
Seattle, WA	Community Police Commission	
Springfield, MO	Police Civilian Review Board	
Spokane, WA	Police Ombudsman	
Syracuse, NY	Citizen Review Board	
Tulare, CA	Citizen Complaint Police Review Board	
Tucson, AZ	Independent Police Auditor & Civilian Investigator	
Urbana, IL	Civilian Police Review Board	
Virginia Beach, VA	Investigation Review Panel	
Washington, D.C.	Office of Police Complaints	
West Valley City, UT	Professional Standards Review Board	

== See also ==
- List of police complaints authorities
- Community policing

=== Related US rules, regulations and laws ===
- Freedom of information
- Sarbanes–Oxley Act
- Patient Protection and Affordable Care Act
- Inspector General Act of 1978
- Privacy Act of 1974
