= List of killings by law enforcement officers in the United States, November 2014 =

This is a list of people reported killed by non-military law enforcement officers in the United States in November 2014, whether in the line of duty or not, and regardless of reason or method. The listing documents the occurrence of a death, making no implications regarding wrongdoing or justification on the part of the person killed or officer involved. Killings are arranged by date of the incident that caused death. Different death dates, if known, are noted in the description. The table below lists 93 people.

== November 2014 ==
Date	Name (Age) of Deceased	Race	State (City)	Description
2014-11-30	Fernando Escovedo (19)	Hispanic	California (Carson)	An officer shot a mentally ill man who police said was coming at another officer with a steak knife.
2014-11-30	Tabanico "Tommy" Ysidro Pirtle (24)	White	Nevada (Elko)	Called for a domestic dispute, police found a man and woman struggling over a rifle. The man gained control of it and ignored police orders to put it down. When he turned towards police, raising the rifle, he was shot.
2014-11-28	Larry Steven McQuilliams (49)	White	Texas (Austin)	McQuilliams was shot and killed outside of Austin Police Headquarters after shooting at the building and at the nearby Mexican Consulate.
2014-11-28	Myles Roughsurface (27)	Native American	New Mexico (Flora Vista)	Responding to a call of a man shooting a rifle, police heard screaming and shots and one shot the suspect when they encountered him.
2014-11-28	Samuel Torres (52)	Hispanic	Michigan (Dearborn)	Police encountered a murder suspect at a dry cleaners. When he drew his weapon, the police fired on him.
2014-11-28	Mark Allan Bartlett (42)	White	Mississippi (Pearl)	Police responded to a domestic disturbance and encountered a man they say brandished a gun at them in a threatening way. An officer shot the man.
2014-11-27	Matthew Cormier (45)	White	Florida (Tampa)	
2014-11-26	Randall Dewayne Roden (41)	White	Missouri (Versailles)	Officers shocked Roden twice with a stun gun, trying to restrain him, but Roden fired "multiple rounds" from a pistol at the officers, a news release said. One round struck a deputy, resulting in minor injuries. The officers then returned fire, killing Roden.
2014-11-26	Daniel Cedar Saulsbury (39)	White	California (Point Arena)	During their attempt to make the arrest, the CHP officer and two deputies deployed their Taser weapons, the sheriff's office stated. The news release did not say how many times Saulsbury was shot with the Tasers or provide any other details about the nature of the medical distress that preceded his death.
2014-11-26	Davis Thomas (22)	White	Texas (Lewisville)	Capt. Dan Rochelle said during a phone interview that the suspect had attempted to carjack a woman's gray SUV that was parked at a gas pump. Rochelle said he did not know if she was inside or outside her vehicle at the time of the attempted carjacking. "Shots were fired and the suspect is deceased," Rochelle said. The shots that killed the suspect, Rochelle said, were from a responding officer.
2014-11-25	Sebastian Lewandowski (31)	White	Washington (Vancouver)	Police reported to the scene of a domestic dispute to find a man with a firearm. When he refused to put it down, officers fired on him. The firearm turned out to be an Airsoft replica of an AR-15.
2014-11-25	Jon Patrick Jaquez (26)	White	Colorado (Pueblo)	Pueblo police and sheriff's deputies were searching at a gas station for a man involved in an assault that left 23-year-old Gilbert Sprague in critical condition earlier that day. Jaquez was found in a stolen Honda near the intersection of East Fourth Street and Troy Avenue about 6:30 p.m. Upon finding Jaquez, officers surrounded the vehicle. Jaquez then accelerated forward striking two officers and then in reverse striking a police vehicle. Pueblo police officer Michael Sincerbox and Pueblo County sheriff's Detective Michael Hecht shot Jon Jaquez multiple times who died at the scene.
2014-11-25	Robert Edwin Eaves (52)	White	Tennessee (Cleveland)	During an interaction with the officers Eaves produced a knife, came at them and one, or both of them opened fire, according to the Tennessee Bureau of Investigation.
2014-11-25	Eric Ricks (30)	Black	Texas (Balch Springs)	Spokesman Mark Maret says Ricks began fighting with officers, which made it impossible to take him into custody. Maret says Ricks became "extremely violent," and says officers used Tasers, "but they didn't stop him." Balch Springs officers called for help, and Dallas County Sheriff's Department deputies and Dallas police officers arrived to help. "We don't know what might have been in his [Ricks'] system," Maret says. "The Tasers basically had no effect on him. That says a lot right there." He says officers "didn't use deadly force" to restrain Ricks. Maret says Ricks was also examined by that CareFlite crew at the scene, but was deemed well enough to be taken by squad car to the Balch Springs Jail. But once they arrived at the jail, Maret says, Ricks was "slumped over" in his seat.
2014-11-24	Juan Jose Enriquez (27)	Hispanic	California (West Covina)	Authorities say a suspect in a fatal shooting was shot to death by West Covina police after he opened fire on officers during a foot chase, hitting and wounding a police dog.
2014-11-24	Leonardo Marquette Little (33)	Black	Florida (Jacksonville)	A Jacksonville police officer shot and killed a man Monday night during a confrontation during traffic stop, according to the Sheriff's Office.
2014-11-23	Justin H. Roady (33)	White	Arizona (Lake Havasu City)	The Havasu Police Department said Roady stepped out of his residence, and raised a handgun in the direction of the responding officers, who fired on him.
2014-11-23	Donald R. Wendt (50)	White	Florida (Bradenton)	Police arrived for a domestic situation involving a Bradenton firefighter and Iraq War Veteran, Donald "Donnie" Wendt, that ended with a SWAT team response and gunfire. "He came out to his front yard with firearms, threatened to kill himself and threatened to kill his sister," said Bradenton Police Chief Michael Radzilowski. Police arrived with negotiators, and after talking, Wendt came out of the house with two guns, pointed at officers, Radzilowski said. One officer fired one shot and killed the man, he said.
2014-11-22	Pamela Edwards (40)	White	Florida (Eustis)	The suspect in an officer-involved shooting on Saturday, Nov. 22, died at Orlando Regional Medical Center Monday November 24, according to a Lake County Sheriff's Office official.
2014-11-22	Bond, Jennifer (??)		Kentucky (Crittenden)	The Grant County Sheriff Chuck Dills admitted December 1 that Bond was Taser'd prior to experiencing a fatal "medical emergency."
2014-11-22	Ty Worthington (26)	White	Utah (South Jordan)	The officer confronted Mr. Worthington in a horse corral and during the confrontation multiple shots were fired. A small caliber handgun was recovered near the deceased, according to a statement from the department.
2014-11-22	Bruce Thomas Snyder (29)	White	California (Sonora)	Snyder left his car, and at some point exchanged gunfire with two deputies from the Sheriff's Office and at least one Sonora officer, authorities said. Police shot him, and Snyder died before he could be taken to a hospital.
2014-11-22	Nestor Cruz-Ciriaco (27)	Hispanic	California (Seaside)	Seaside police responding to a domestic violence call shot and killed 27-year-old Nestor Cruz-Ciriaco, who was wielding a sharp instrument and may have taken a small child hostage.
2014-11-22	Curtis Wade Holley (53)	White	Florida (Tallahassee)	Holley set his house on fire and then shot and killed a deputy, who had arrived to investigate it, with a .40-caliber handgun. The deputy was shot from behind. Holley then took the deputy's handgun and shot and wounded another deputy. He then was shot and killed by a Tallahassee police officer who lived nearby. Holley was believed to have anti-government views.
2014-11-22	Tamir Rice (12)	Black	Ohio (Cleveland)	Tamir Rice, a 12-year-old boy, who stood 5'9" and weighed 195 lb., was shot at a recreational center by a police officer responding to a 911 call about a black male waving around and pointing a gun at people in the park. The 12-year-old had an Airsoft replica handgun, its orange safety tip removed, tucked in his waistband. As the police car skidded to a halt on the snowy grass, the passenger side officer jumped out of the car and Tamir, standing no more than 10 feet (3.0 m) from the officer, grabbed for his gun. The 6-month rookie officer fired twice, striking Tamir once in the abdomen. The 6-year veteran officer driving the car reported the shooting to dispatch and described the victim as a black male in his mid-20s. Rice died the next day despite surgery in a local hospital. According to Deputy Chief Ed Tomba, the boy did not point the gun or make any verbal threats before he was shot. The officers involved have been criticized for not giving Rice first aid after the shooting. First aid was rendered several minutes later by an FBI agent, who heard about the shooting on his scanner and proceeded to the park to render assistance as needed.
2014-11-21	Elton R. Loughrey Jr. (41)	White	Missouri (Clarkton)	Holder said Loughrey stepped from his vehicle and allegedly fired a gun at one of the officers. Holder said one of the officers allegedly fired back, hitting the man.
2014-11-21	Carey Smith-Viramontes (18)	Hispanic	California (Long Beach)	Long Beach Police Department spokeswoman Marlene Arrona, who released few details about the death, said "During the course of the investigation" a man was shot inside a home. A knife was found at the scene, she said.
2014-11-20	Akai Gurley (28)	Black	New York (New York City)	Akai Gurley was shot and killed while in the seventh floor of an unlit stairwell at the Louis H. Pink Houses, a housing project in Brooklyn. According to police, the shooting was believed to be the result of an accidental discharge of a gun caused by NYPD officer Peter Liang, who had 18 months of experience on the job at the time of the shooting. Liang was with a partner and had his flashlight and service firearm out "for safety reasons," and the partner did not draw his weapon, according to New York Police Commissioner William Bratton. In 2015, Liang was charged with second-degree manslaughter and assault.
2014-11-20	Chelsea Fresh (29)	White	Oregon (Beaverton)	The woman killed by police in Beaverton last week was holding an empty rifle, despite her threats that it was loaded, investigators said Tuesday. Chelsea Fresh, 29, was shot and killed by police on Nov. 20 outside a Beaverton apartment after she pointed a rifle at officers, investigators said.
2014-11-20	Charles Marcus McCauley (35)	White	Louisiana (Shreveport)	Shreveport Police Department spokesman Cpl. Marcus Hines said the man—identified as 35-year-old Charles Marcus McCauley of Shreveport—pulled out a handgun during a struggle with two Centenary College Department of Public Safety officers. In response, one of the officers fired at least one gunshot at McCauley in front of the John F. Magale Memorial Library, where he collapsed.
2014-11-20	Myron May (31)	Black	Florida (Tallahassee)	Myron May, a graduate of Florida State University, opened fire near the school's library, wounding three students, one critically. May then fired shots at a campus police officer. The officers returned fire, killing May.
2014-11-19	Keara Crowder (29)	Black	Tennessee (Memphis)	Memphis Police Officers and domestic partners Jaselyn Grant and Crowder had apparently gotten into an argument when Grant fired shots at Crowder. Officers found Crowder lying in the front yard of the home. Authorities say that Grant not only fired shots at Crowder but also found out that she allegedly shot at Crowder's 12 year-old son.
2014-11-18	Vincent Martinez (34)	Hispanic	California (Riverside)	The man – identified by relatives as 34-year-old Vincent Martinez – led officers on a foot chase before pulling a loaded gun, police said in a news release.
2014-11-18	Michael Case (34)	White	Florida (Dunedin)	Two deputies fatally shot a Dunedin man with a knife who disobeyed orders to stop advancing toward them early Tuesday, the Pinellas County Sheriff's Office said.
2014-11-18	Charles McBennett (45)	White	North Carolina (Fayetteville)	A burglary suspect who shot a Fayetteville police officer Tuesday died after a shoot-out with officers at a home on Rosehill Road near Warrenwood Elementary.
2014-11-17	Thomas Read (36)	White	New Jersey (Phillipsburg)	When police arrived about 9:30 Monday morning to the 400 block of South Main Street in Phillipsburg for a person who allegedly sent threatening messages to someone else, they saw Read inside 463 S. Main St. wielding a knife in a threatening manner and refusing to come outside, the Warren County Prosecutor's Office said. The man ignored police orders to drop the knife as they confronted him in a South Main Street building, and police shot Read, the prosecutor's office said. Read had a history of mental health issues. In February 2015, the county prosecutor's office ruled that deadly force was justified.
2014-11-16	Christopher Neil Horine (42)	White	Kentucky (Shelby County)	When the trooper arrived, the man fired a shot from a porch, causing the trooper to take cover behind his cruiser, according to police. The man fired again and advanced on the trooper, who returned fire and struck the man, police said.
2014-11-16	Lenny Miles (37)	White	Oregon (Klamath Falls)	Police in Klamath Falls exchanged gunfire with a fleeing grocery store robbery suspect Sunday night and the suspect was killed, Klamath County District Attorney Rob Patridge said.
2014-11-16	Cecil Chaney Tinker-Smith (37)	Black	Washington (Deming)	Officers drove to the scene and saw the suspect, who ran into the home and fired a shot at deputies, Parks said. More law enforcement officers were called to the scene and were preparing to enter the home when the man allegedly fired on the deputies three times. Sheriff's deputies returned fire and killed the suspect, Parks said.
2014-11-16	Dawn Renee Cameron (46)	White	Florida (Inverness)	A Citrus County sheriff's deputy shot and killed a woman in Inverness after she allegedly fought him, grabbed his taser and pointed it at him Sunday night.
2014-11-16	John R. Smelko (40)	White	Ohio (Dayton)	An officer asked a visibly drunk Smelko to raise his hands. Smelko pointed a gun in the officer's face. One shot to the torso ended Smelko's life.
2014-11-16	Eduardo Bermudez (26)	Hispanic	California (Los Angeles)	Deputies shot one man dead in East Los Angeles when he wielded a replica .45 handgun and another man as he stood in the line of fire, authorities said. On Monday, the Los Angeles County Coroner's Office identified the man who was said to be wielding the replica gun as 26-year-old Eduardo Bermundez—the passenger in the vehicle—and the driver as 57-year-old Ricardo Avelar-Lara.
2014-11-16	Ricardo Avelar-Lara (57)	Hispanic	California (Los Angeles)	Deputies shot one man dead in East Los Angeles when he wielded a replica .45 handgun and another man as he stood in the line of fire, authorities said. On Monday, the Los Angeles County Coroner's Office identified the man who was said to be wielding the replica gun as 26-year-old Eduardo Bermundez—the passenger in the vehicle—and the driver as 57-year-old Ricardo Avelar-Lara.
2014-11-15	Juventino Bermudez-Arenas (33)	Hispanic	Oregon (McMinnville)	Police said the suspect confronted them with a knife. He was fatally shot by officers and died of multiple gunshot wounds, a medical examiner confirmed.
2014-11-14	Wesley Castillo (35)	Hispanic	California (Chula Vista)	Police officials said their investigation, which is continuing, showed that Wesley Castillo, who had a history of mental illness, struggled over his brother's handgun, then attacked him with two large steak knives. "As Wesley was stabbing Bryan, Bryan fired several times," Chula Vista police Capt. Roxana Kennedy said in a statement.
2014-11-14	Sharrinder Garcha (20)	Asian	Wisconsin (Lafayette)	While parked in the parking lot at 16315 CTH J, Sharrinder Garcha assaulted Investigator Gray with a knife causing many injuries from the lacerations administered. During the struggle Investigator Gray managed to retrieve his hand gun and shot and killed Sharrinder Garcha.
2014-11-14	William F. McNulty (41)	White	Delaware (Claymont)	Police say McNulty continued to accelerate in reverse towards the Troopers in his Toyota. That is when the two Troopers discharged multiple rounds from their handguns, striking the rear window of the Toyota and McNulty who was still located in the driver's seat.
2014-11-14	Tahhahwah, Christina (37)		Oklahoma (Lawton)	Tahhahwah had stopped taking medication for bipolar disorder. Her grandparents called Lawton police to help take her for medical assistance. They arrested and took her to jail where she died of cardiac arrest while handcuffed to a cell door. She had been repeatedly Taser'd. Police released a redacted surveillance video.
2014-11-14	Shonda E. Mikelson (33)	White	Wisconsin (Boyceville)	When an officer arrived at the home, they say Mikelson came to the door with a rifle in her right hand. The officer told her to drop the gun, but police say she refused, and then brought her left hand from behind her back revealing a handgun that she pointed at the officer. That's when the officer fired a round at Mikelson, killing her. Police say they later found out the handgun she used was a replica.
2014-11-13	Anderson, Taneisha (37)		Ohio (Cleveland)	Tanisha Anderson called out for her brother and mother while an officer repeatedly pressed down on her head to get her into the backseat. After several attempts, the officer used a takedown move to force her to the pavement, Joell Anderson said. The officer placed his knee on Tanisha Anderson's back and handcuffed her. She never opened her eyes or spoke another word, her brother said.
2014-11-13	Andrew Brady Davidson (33)	White	Ohio (Butler Township)	During a stop in the parking lot of Panera Bread, Davidson refused to comply with officers' verbal commands and attempted to spray officers with pepper spray and threatened to kill police, according to the statement. According to the statement, Davidson exited his vehicle and advanced toward an officer with a knife in his hand. The officer then shot Davidson in order to defend his own life. Davidson was pronounced dead at the scene.
2014-11-13	James Christopher McCown Jr. (29)	White	Tennessee (Knox County)	Deputies tried to arrest him, but instead, they say the man pulled a gun on them firing one round. They fired back and killed him.
2014-11-13	George Armando Ramirez (35)	Hispanic	California (San Bernardino)	Undercover Downey police officers were in the area for a narcotics investigation. "As they approached the residence, they were immediately met by gunfire from some suspects that were standing by a car in the front yard of the residence," San Bernardino Police Lt. Rich Lawhead said. One suspect was killed.
2014-11-13	Darnell Dayron Stafford (31)	Black	New Jersey (Trenton)	A man was fatally shot by police after allegedly opening fire on a police cruiser and engaging in a gunfight with officers.
2014-11-13	Ramiro James "De La Rosa" Villegas (22)	Hispanic	California (Bakersfield)	The officers gave commands to Villegas to stop approaching and to raise his hands. Witnesses stated that Villegas refused to comply with the officers' commands and continued to approach the officers in a confrontational manner and at one point suddenly reached towards his front waistband. Three of the officers immediately fired multiple rounds, striking Villegas, while one officer deployed his Taser. No weapon was recovered at the scene.
2014-11-12	Jose Avalos (26)	Hispanic	California (Concord)	A carjacking suspect was shot and killed by a Concord police officer in the Willows Shopping Center parking lot after reportedly slamming his vehicle into a police car, prompting an officer to fire several times at the suspect.
2014-11-11	Aaron Forgash (38)	White	California (Perris)	The man was shot in the front yard of a house along Palma Bonita Lane in the Villages of Avalon near Frank Eaton Park, just west of the Lake Perris dam. He died at the scene. No officers were hurt. It was unclear what prompted the police gunfire. A witness told The Press-Enterprise that Forgash's hands were empty when he got out of the minivan. She said a motorcycle officer fired when the man, with his hands down, made what she described as a twisting motion with his upper body.
2014-11-11	David Daniel McBrayer (26)	White	Alabama (Jacksonville)	The State Bureau of Investigations is looking into a deadly, officer-involved shooting in Calhoun County. It happened late Tuesday night at the Coliseum Apartments, near the Jacksonville State University campus. In video from cameras worn by the police officers, McBrayer, knife in hand, walks forward toward one of the officers. McBrayer can be seen walking to within about 3 feet (0.91 m) of the officer, who continues to yell at him to drop the knife. The officer then fires five quick bursts into McBrayer's chest before he falls forward and rolls onto his back, the knife lying next to his right hand.
2014-11-11	Trung Thanh Do (31)	Asian	Florida (Plant City)	According to Plant City police, Officer James Burchett walked out the front door and around to the back. Through a bedroom window, he spotted a man stabbing a woman. He shouted for the man to stop. When he didn't, Burchett went for his gun and fired a single shot. The assailant fell dead.
2014-11-11	Jerry Lee Matheny (52)	White	California (Menlo Park)	Matheny, a suspected burglar with a gun was shot and killed by three police officers in a neighborhood after they chased him on foot. According to police, Matheny brandished a firearm and fired a shot at Sgt. Jaime Romero, missing him. An officer reportedly hurt his knee during the foot chase.
2014-11-09	Ashif Anwar (38)	Asian	Texas (Irving)	A man in a car was shot by two police officers after he tried to maneuver around a SWAT vehicle, hitting it and another vehicle, in the parking lot of a hotel. The man had a warrant for his arrest on several felony charges.
2014-11-09	Josue Narciso Fuentes (22)	Hispanic	California (Los Angeles)	The shooting death in the Van Nuys neighborhood was one of three officer-involved shootings over the weekend.
2014-11-09	Christopher Keith O'Neal (56)	White	California (Lucerne)	A man wielding a knife was shot and killed by two Lake County sheriff's deputies after they arrived at a home, responding to a domestic disturbance. According to the county district attorney, the man charged at the deputies with a knife.
2014-11-09	Aura Rosser (40)	Black	Michigan (Ann Arbor)	Rosser was shot by police twice after she confronted them with a knife. It was the first fatal officer-involved shooting in Ann Arbor in nearly 40 years.
2014-11-09	Jorge Trejo (34)	Hispanic	California (Los Angeles)	After a car chase with multiple gunshot exchanges, an LADP spokesperson said Trejo pointed a shotgun at the officers, who shot him dead at the scene.
2014-11-09	Zamora, Daniel (48)		Arizona (Phoenix)	Officers said they found Zamora, 48, acting paranoid when they found him. Zamora told police he believed someone was trying to hurt him and did not believe the officers when they told him they were members of law enforcement. A confrontation ensued when officers tried to calm Zamora down and, in turn, Zamora tried to punch an officer, police said. Zamora was handcuffed after a brief struggle, and police say he became unresponsive and stopped breathing.
2014-11-08	Atkinson, Keith (23)		New Jersey (Manchester)	Keith Atkinson Jr., 23, was struck by a police car around 11:15 p.m. while he was walking in the middle of the roadway, Ocean County Prosecutor's Office spokesman Al Della Fave said. Apparently drunk and confused, he had tried to forcibly enter a home and then was leaving the area when struck.
2014-11-08	Davenport, Carlos (51)		Kansas (Kansas City)	Devastated family members had their first look at the scene of an officer-involved shooting that left a 51-year-old man dead after police said he charged an officer with a sword. Police said Davenport refused orders to drop the blade and charged at an officer, who fired at Davenport in self-defense. Davenport died on the scene.
2014-11-08	David Wyatt Grayson (57)	White	Texas (Sansom Park)	David Wyatt Grayson was armed with a knife and holding a woman inside the home, Sansom Park police officials said. Grayson refused to let the woman go or to leave the house, so officers went inside the house, officials said. One officer fired shots at Grayson, who was later pronounced dead at the scene, according to police records.
2014-11-08	Troy Hart (27)	White	Michigan (Westland)	A 27-year-old man is dead after an altercation with police in Westland Saturday night. According to the Westland Police Chief, several witnesses said he had threatened to kill people, police, or he wanted someone to kill him. Police say at some point, Hart charged at officers with a hunting knife. That's when officers opened fire.
2014-11-08	Jeremy Michael Sherbon (34)	White	Oklahoma (Oklahoma City)	When Officer Fale attempted to exit his vehicle, Sherbon turned and fired multiple shots at him, missing him but hitting his police cruiser, officials said. According to the police report, Officers Fale and Wallace returned fire as Sherbon continued to fire at them. Sherbon was struck and died at the scene, officials said.
2014-11-08	Joy Ann Sherman (52)	Native American	South Dakota (Mitchell)	Attorney General Marty Jackley issued a statement Monday night saying 52-year-old Joy Ann Sherman had died in a Sioux Falls hospital. She was taken there after being shot by Patrol Sgt. David Beintema at a motel on Saturday evening. Authorities say Sherman was shot after she pointed a gun at officers.
2014-11-08	Adam Thomas (27)	White	California (Hemet)	An off-duty U.S. Border Patrol agent allegedly shot and killed 27-year-old Adam Thomas after an argument between the two in their neighborhood at 12:45 a.m. The agent, 40-year-old John Demery, was arrested and booked on suspicion of homicide.
2014-11-07	William Forrest Spargur II (36)	White	California (Palmdale)	"Palmdale station deputies received a call of, 'a man with a gun who was possibly suicidal,'" Rouzan stated. "Upon arrival, deputies contacted the suspect, who pointed a gun at them." The man was shot by deputies and pronounced dead at the scene, and a gun was recovered, according to Rouzan. The man was possibly a veteran suffering from PTSD.
2014-11-06	Cinque D'Jahspora (20)	Black	Tennessee (Jackson)	Officer Raymond Dewayne Bond shot Cinque D'Jahspora, 20, of Jackson, after D'Jahspora attacked and stabbed him, police said.
2014-11-06	Daniel Young (26)	White	Idaho (Jerome)	In a media release Friday, McFall said the incident began when a deputy contacted three men, one of them Young, walking south on South 100 East. Two other deputies arrived on scene a short time later. Young was armed with a handgun, McFall said. Officials have not said if Young threatened the deputies or released any other information about the events leading up to the shooting.
2014-11-05	Robert William Hampton III (33)	Black	Nevada (Reno)	During a traffic stop, a K-9 deputy and members of the USMS fugitive task force attempted to arrest Mr. Hampton for his felony warrants. Mr. Hampton became uncooperative, ignored the commands of the deputy, backed his vehicle a short distance and accelerated forward striking the deputy in the hand and the leg with his vehicle, causing minor injuries to the K-9 deputy. Fearing for his safety, the K-9 deputy discharged his firearm into the vehicle, striking and killing Mr. Hampton.
2014-11-05	Anderson, William (71)		Alabama (Hartselle)	The Hartselle Police Officer was traveling south on Sparkman Street, north of Hickory Street, when he struck 71-year-old William Elbert Anderson of Cullman as he crossed the street in front of him.
2014-11-05	Anthony Laviolette (27)	White	Washington (Yakima)	Anthony Duane La Violette, 27, was fatally shot by Yakima County sheriff's Deputy Matt Steadman following a chase from the Naches area. Officials said Steadman opened fire after being knocked down by the car La Violette was driving.
2014-11-04	Ernest Franklin McKnight Jr. (64)	Unknown race	Ohio (Kitts Hill)	The Lawrence County Sheriff's Office released the name of a man who was killed by deputies during a drug raid. Deputies and officers with the Lawrence County Drug and Major Crimes Task Force said they were serving a search warrant to McKnight when he pointed a rifle at them. Deputies said they shot McKnight who was pronounced dead.
2014-11-03	Unidentified (60s-70s)	Unknown	Florida (Golden Glades)	FBI special agent George Piro said members of the North Miami Police Department's Street Crimes Task Force caught up with the man at the intersection just east of Interstate 95. Authorities exchanged gunfire with the suspect, who was shot and killed.
2014-11-03	Caleb Joseph Ryan (28)	White	Alabama (Blountsville)	Today, the Blount County Coroner identified the victim as 24-year-old Caleb Joseph Ryan of Blountsville. Deputies said Ryan ran from them when they responded to a call at a home. One deputy followed, the two men got into a fight, and the deputy fired his gun.
2014-11-03	Fulton, Aaron (28)		Ohio (Marietta)	The Ohio State Highway Patrol says the man hit and killed by a Sheriff's deputy, is 28-year-old Aaron Fulton.
2014-11-03	Raupheal Thomas (29)	Black	Ohio (Akron)	The family of 29-year-old Raupheal Thomas confirms he was shot and killed Monday evening. Two officers had arrived after officers received a call for two suspicious men who could be "casing" on Orrin Street near Roslyn Avenue. They confronted the men. Police say one of the men became confrontational, so the officer attempted to take him into custody. During the struggle, police say shots were fired. Police say they recovered a handgun at the scene.
2014-11-03	Christopher Anderson (27)	Black	Illinois (Highland Park)	Christopher Anderson, 27, was shot Monday by Highland Park police officers after he refused to put the gun down, authorities said.
2014-11-02	William A. Collins (28)	White	Missouri (El Dorado Springs)	Authorities said a deputy with the Cedar County Sheriff's Office attempted to stop the driver of a vehicle for a traffic violation at 12:21 a.m. Sunday. The vehicle failed to yield and a short vehicle pursuit ensued. During the pursuit, police said a passenger exited the vehicle at the intersection of Hickory and High Streets in El Dorado Springs and fled on foot. The deputy then exited his vehicle and a foot chase ensued, leading to a physical altercation and exchange of gunfire. Police said the suspect who fled from the vehicle, William A. Collins, a 28-year-old man from El Dorado Springs, was pronounced dead at the scene by Cedar County Coroner Bill Neale.
2014-11-02	Charles Emmett Logan (68)	Black	Minnesota (Maplewood)	Logan was located three blocks from the hospital with the metal bar in hand, police say. Ramsey County Sheriff's deputies responded and tried to Taser Logan, but it didn't work. He was taken to the ground by deputies and became unresponsive moments after being handcuffed, police say. First responders administered CPR, and Logan was taken back to St. John's Hospital where he was later pronounced dead, police say.
2014-11-02	Jesus Zuriel Orduno Luviano (20)	Hispanic	California (Indio)	Officers with the California Highway Patrol attempted to pull over Luviano for suspected DUI on eastbound Highway 111 near Jefferson Street. Luviano didn't stop at first, but then pulled over and got out of the car with a shotgun, according to the sheriff's department. Officers said they ordered him to lower the weapon but he refused. According to Deputy Armando Munoz with the Riverside County Sheriff's Department, the suspect pulled out a shotgun and fired off at least one round, leading officers to return fire, ultimately killing Luviano at the scene.
2014-11-01	Richard Barrett (62)	White	California (Long Beach)	The man shot and killed by a Long Beach Police Department (LBPD) officer on November 1 has been identified by the coroner's office as 62-year-old Richard Joseph Barrett.
2014-11-01	John Brantley Jr. (43)	White	California (Garden Grove)	A male resident armed himself with a shotgun and was later stabbed in the arm, said Stauffer, who added cops managed to get inside and confront Brantley before the officer-involved shooting happened. The shooter has not been identified. Brantley was taken to UCI Medical Center in Orange, where he died from his injuries.
2014-11-01	Cabral, Rodrigo (27)		California (Visalia)	A man is dead after being hit by a Visalia police car early Saturday morning.
2014-11-01	Francisco David Galvez (49)	Hispanic	Arizona (Tucson)	The Tucson Police Department is investigating the death of a bicyclist who was struck and killed by an unmarked police car.
2014-11-01	John T. Wilson III (22)	Black	Nevada (North Las Vegas)	The rifle-wielding man who was shot and killed by a Nevada Highway Patrol officer early Saturday morning was identified Sunday by the Clark County coroner's office.

== See also ==
- Death in custody § United States
- Henry A. Wallace Police Crime Public Database
- List of cases of police brutality
- List of countries with annual rates and counts for killings by law enforcement officers
- List of law enforcement officers killed in the line of duty in the United States
- List of law enforcement officers convicted for an on-duty killing in the United States
- List of shootings by US immigration agents
- List of police reforms related to the George Floyd protests
- List of unarmed African Americans killed by law enforcement officers in the United States
- Lists of killings by law enforcement officers
- Police brutality in the United States
- Police misconduct § United States
- Police riot § United States
- Police use of deadly force in the United States
