= Death of Frank Pojman =

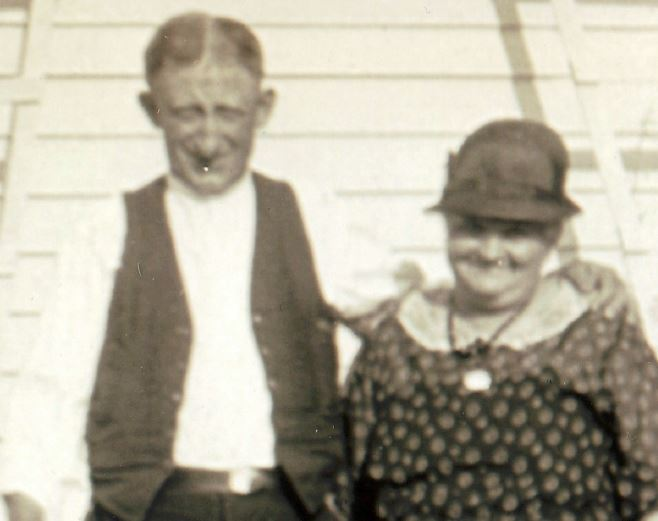
Frank and Justina Pojman

Frank Pojman was arrested by two Cleveland Police patrolmen on May 7, 1934, for alleged intoxication. It was later discovered that en route to the police station, he was assaulted by the patrolmen, even suffering a fractured skull, and later died from his injuries.

== Background ==
František Pojman was born in Čimelice, Bohemia (modern day Czech Republic) on December 4, 1879, to parents Josef Pojman and Anna Blaha and later emigrated to the United States around 1890. On September 30, 1902, he married Justina Hodan (c. 1881 – 1951). The couple went on to have nine children: Anna, Marie, Joseph, Frank, Cecilia, Edward (died in childhood), James, Dorothy, and Ruth. Mr. Pojman died on May 8, 1934.

== Arrest and death ==
Around 12:15 am on May 7, 1934, Cleveland Police Patrolmen Theodore Frank Hall and William S. Simader were called to St. Procop's Parish Hall for a minor traffic accident. According to witnesses, bystander Frank Pojman, who was attending a church social, approached the patrolmen to ask "What's going on here?" to which one responded "None of your business" and then shoved Pojman. After giving a "sharp answer" to the patrolmen, Pojman was arrested. On the way back to the Ninth Street Precinct, the wagon stopped twice, during which the patrolmen assaulted Pojman. He was taken to City Hospital, arriving around 12:30 am, where Dr. William Cardozo examined him and found that Pojman had a bloody nose, his right eye was black, and there was a wound on the back of his head. After treatment, Pojman was taken to the precinct and held overnight. When released the next morning, he was confused and wandered around the neighborhood, even trying to gain entrance into someone's home. Thinking that he was intoxicated, police officials re-arrested Pojman. After being returned to the precinct station, he again was taken to the hospital, and then returned to the police station where he was later found unconscious in his cell. Before he arrived for a third time to City Hospital, he was dead. In the autopsy, it was discovered that Pojman had died from a fractured skull.

== Community response and protest ==
Since Pojman was of Czechoslovak descent, 2000 members of the Czechoslovak community were especially outraged by his death. They gathered at a mass meeting at the Sokol Hall and even sent Mayor Harry L. Davis demands, stating that:

- Those responsible for the death be punished speedily
- The police department be thoroughly cleansed
- Third-degree methods be abolished
- Humane treatment be accorded all prisoners
- No whitewashing of the case be allowed

Joseph Martinek, the editor of the American Labor News (a Czech-language socialist weekly), was the meeting's principal speaker and was quoted as saying, "the time has come when Cleveland must put an end to police brutality." Moreover, he added, "Our police are extremely gentle with gangsters, racketeers and robbers. But the same police who are mild with real criminals too often are brutal to minor offenders. Frank Pojman was murdered by members of the Cleveland Police Department. It was one of the most hideous crimes in the history of Cleveland. We can't bring Frank Pojman back to life, but we can see that this case is the last one of its kind."

== Aftermath ==
Patrolmen Hall and Simader initially claimed that Pojman had incurred all injuries after falling onto the floor of the patrol wagon. Therefore, the police department's own report cleared police of any responsibility in the death of Pojman. After receiving said report, Safety Director Martin Lavelle asked for a grand jury investigation to further determine the facts of the case. Warrants for the arrest of Hall and Simader were quickly issued after seven witnesses came forward to testify that the patrol wagon had made two stops en route to City Hospital and that those witnesses could hear cries of "Help, help" from within the wagon. After being arrested, the two patrolmen were suspended by Police Chief George J. Matowitz on the charges of (1) neglect of duty, (2) the making of a false official report, and (3) unnecessary and unwarranted violence toward a prisoner. Dr. A. J. Pearse performed an autopsy and found that Pojman had died of a fractured skull and reported many bruises on the body and the absence of alcohol in the stomach. Hall and Simader then admitted that they had falsified the initial police report when they wrote that "no untoward incident had occurred in the wagon. On June 19, 1934, Hall and Simader were convicted of assault and battery by a jury. The law provided a maximum penalty of six months in the workhouse and no more than a $200 fine. They received the full sentence. After much deliberation, the city of Cleveland awarded widow Justina Pojman $6,500 on January 11, 1937.
