= Cleveland Community Police Commission =

Police oversight board in Cleveland, Ohio, US

The Cleveland Community Police Commission is a civilian oversight body with final authority on police policy, discipline, and training.

== History ==
In the aftermath of the 2014 Killing of Tamir Rice, the 2015 United States Department of Justice consent decree showed a Cleveland Division of Police pattern of excessive use of force, established the Community Police Commission, and required a community policing model department wide rather than a designated unit.

The implementation of the consent decree has been met with resistance from the Cleveland Police Patrolmen's Association (CPPA), the labor union representing the city's patrol officers. In 2015, then-CPPA President Steve Loomis criticized aspects of the agreement, arguing that some provisions, such as allowing anonymous civilian complaints, violated the union's existing contract and could put officers in danger. The union's opposition to the consent decree was a factor in its decision to endorse Donald Trump in the 2016 presidential election.

In 2021, Cleveland voters passed Issue 24, writing the Community Police Commission into the city charter.

== Procedures ==
The mayor and City Council nominate the 13 commissioners, who investigate and make decisions about resident complaints. The commission can override police discipline decisions and direct the review board to investigate officers’ conduct. The city charter requires that the budget increase with either inflation or with the size of the police budget. The Commission must be demographically representative of the city.

== Commission work ==
The commission has working groups to:

- list Cleveland officers with Brady cases of misconduct, public complaints, or use of force reports
- analyze sexual misconduct and gender-based violence involving community members
- host an event for people to learn about use of force training and provide feedback
- review surveillance via the Real Time Crime Center, including ShotSpotter, automated license plate readers, and street cameras

Commissioners do not need a public records request to obtain relevant information, with more access than the public.

On Dec. 19, 2023, the Commission voted to restrict the issuance of police policies without pre-approval, which Mayor Bibb called dangerous.
