= A People's Archive of Police Violence in Cleveland =

A People's Archive of Police Violence in Cleveland is a local community created digital archive created in 2015 in response to the Killing of Tamir Rice. The archive documents community experiences not expressed in news, government, and police narratives. The archive uses the Omeka platform for community members to submit their stories.^{:158}

The founders tied the project to healing from state violence. The directors compared the project to the tradition of archival activism in South Africa.^{:364} The archive features photographs and oral testimony. Archivist Jarret M. Drake says "Archives have never been neutral." Communal archives seek to return historical cultivation from centralized institutions to local communities and dismantle assumptions of gender, race, and ability.
