= Killing of Tamir Rice =

2014 police killing of an African-American boy in Cleveland, Ohio

- Tamir Rice in 2014
- Date: November 22, 2014
- Time: c. 3:30 p.m.
- Location: Cudell Recreation Center, Cleveland, Ohio, U.S.; 41.479083°N 81.752365°W
- Type: Child homicide by shooting, police killing
- Filmed by: Surveillance video
- Participants: Timothy Loehmann (police officer who fired fatal shot); Frank Garmback (police officer); Constance Hollinger (911 dispatcher)
- Outcome: Loehmann fired in 2017
- Deaths: Tamir Rice
- Inquiries: Closed investigation
- Charges: None
- Litigation: Lawsuit filed by Rice's family against the two officers and the City of Cleveland settled for $6 million; Claim filed by the City of Cleveland for cost of Rice's ambulance ride (later withdrawn)

On November 22, 2014, Tamir E. Rice, a twelve-year-old African-American boy, was killed in Cleveland, Ohio, by Timothy Loehmann, a 26-year-old white patrolman with the Cleveland Division of Police (CDP). Rice was carrying an airsoft gun; Loehmann shot him almost immediately upon arriving on the scene. Loehmann and his partner, 46-year-old Frank Garmback, had been responding to a dispatch call regarding a male who had a gun. A caller reported that a male was pointing "a pistol" at random people at the Cudell Recreation Center, a park in Cleveland's Public Works Department. The caller twice told the dispatcher that the pistol was "probably fake", and also stated that the male was "probably a juvenile"; the dispatcher did not relay either of these statements to Loehmann and Garmback.

Loehmann and Garmback reported that when they arrived at the scene, both continuously yelled "show me your hands" through the open patrol car window. Loehmann further stated that instead of showing his hands, it appeared as if Rice was trying to draw: "I knew it was a gun and I knew it was coming out." Loehmann shot twice, hitting Rice once in the torso. Rice died the following day.

Rice's gun was found to be an airsoft replica; it lacked the orange-tipped barrel that is intended to indicate it not being a firearm. A surveillance video of the incident was released by the CDP four days after the shooting. On June 3, 2015, the Cuyahoga County Sheriff's Office declared that their investigation had been completed and that they had turned their findings over to the county prosecutor. Several months later the prosecution presented evidence to a grand jury, which declined to indict, primarily on the basis that Rice was drawing what appeared to be an actual firearm from his waist as Loehmann and Garmback arrived. A lawsuit brought against the City of Cleveland by Rice's family was subsequently settled for $6 million.

In the aftermath of the shooting it was revealed that Loehmann, in his previous job as a police officer in the Cleveland suburb of Independence, had been deemed an emotionally unstable recruit and unfit for duty. Loehmann did not disclose this fact on his application to join the CDP, and the CDP did not review his previous personnel file before hiring him. In 2017, following an investigation, Loehmann was fired for withholding this information on his application. A review by retired FBI agent Kimberly Crawford found that Rice's death was justified and Loehmann's "response was a reasonable one." The incident received both national and international coverage, occurring on the heels of several other high-profile shootings of African-American males by police officers.

== Biography ==
Tamir Elijah Rice (June 25, 2002 – November 23, 2014) was born in Cleveland, Ohio, on June 25, 2002, to Samaria Rice and Leonard Warner. His family described him as athletic, excelling at various sports—including football, basketball, swimming and soccer—and often competing with kids older than him. At age 12, Rice stood 5'7" and weighed 195 lbs. He was involved in arts programs at his community recreation center, sculpting pottery and crocheting embroidery for his mother. At the time of his death, Rice attended Marion-Seltzer Elementary School in Cleveland, where he was described as a "pleasant young man." He had an older sister, Tajai, and an older brother.

== Shooting ==
Surveillance screenshot of Rice shot by the police; this screenshot is of an enhanced video released for the grand jury.

On the afternoon of November 22, 2014, a 9-1-1 caller, who was sitting in a nearby gazebo, reported that someone, possibly a juvenile, was pointing "a pistol" at random people at the Cudell Recreation Center in Cleveland. The caller twice said that the gun was "probably fake." According to police spokesmen, it was initially unclear whether or not that information had been relayed to the dispatched Cleveland Division of Police (CDP) officers, Timothy Loehmann (26) and Frank Garmback (46); it was later revealed that the dispatcher had not elaborated beyond referencing "a gun." According to one report, the dispatcher twice asked whether the boy was black or white before sending Loehmann and Garmback to the recreation center at around 3:30 p.m. The actual recording of the phone call reveals that the dispatcher asked whether the boy was black or white three times. The question was repeated after the caller continued describing the color of Rice's clothing. The caller then left the gazebo, and Rice sat down in it sometime later.

According to information reported to the press on the day of the shooting by Cleveland Police Patrolmen's Association President Jeffrey Follmer, "[Loehmann and Garmback] pulled into the parking lot and saw a few people sitting underneath a pavilion next to the center. [Loehmann] saw a black gun sitting on the table, and he saw the boy pick up the gun and put it in his waistband." Also on that date, Cleveland Deputy Police Chief Tomba stated, "The officer got out of the car and told the boy to put his hands up. The boy reached into his waistband, pulled out the gun and [Loehmann] fired two shots." According to Tomba, "the child did not threaten the officer verbally or physically." On November 26, the day a video of the shooting was released, Tomba is quoted as saying, "Loehmann shouted from the car three times at Tamir to show his hands as he approached the car." A Justice Department investigation concluded Loehmann exited the vehicle while it was still coming to a stop and fired two shots less than two seconds after opening the passenger door.

Rice died the following day at MetroHealth Medical Center. The medical examiner stated that the cause of death was a gunshot wound to the torso, with injuries to major vessels, the intestines and the pelvis.

A surveillance video without audio of the shooting was released by the CDP on November 26 after pressure from the public and Rice's family. It showed Rice pacing around the park, occasionally extending his right arm. The video briefly shows Rice talking on a cellphone and sitting at a picnic table in a gazebo. A patrol car moves at high speed across the park lawn and then stops abruptly by the gazebo. Rice appears to move his hand, an action police experts concluded was Rice reaching for his waist band but disputed by expert reports released by Rice family attorneys, before Loehmann jumps out of the car and immediately shoots Rice from a distance of less than 10 feet (3.0 m). The entire incident happened within a span of two seconds. According to Judge Ronald B. Adrine, in a judgement entry on the case, "this court is still thunderstruck by how quickly this event turned deadly.... On the video the zone car containing Patrol Officers Loehmann and Garmback is still in the process of stopping when Rice is shot."

Killing of Tamir Rice (Cleveland)

Almost four minutes later, a police detective and an agent from the Federal Bureau of Investigation who had been working a bank robbery detail nearby arrived on the scene and treated the boy. Three minutes after that, paramedics arrived and took him to MetroHealth Medical Center.

Rice's mother said that the airsoft gun had been given to him by a friend minutes before the police arrived, that police tackled and put her 14-year-old daughter in handcuffs after the incident, and that police threatened her with arrest if she did not calm down after being told about her son's shooting.

A second video obtained by the Northeast Ohio Media Group and released on January 7, 2015, shows Rice's 14-year-old sister being forced to the ground, handcuffed and placed in a patrol car after she ran toward her brother about two minutes after the shooting. Furthermore, no aid was administered to Rice for four minutes until an FBI agent arrived, which the agent later attributed to how the Cleveland Police officers "didn't know what to do" as Rice's wound required a more advanced level of first aid in which the officers were not trained.

== Police officers involved ==
In the aftermath of the shooting, media outlets reported on the background of the police officers involved. Both officers were placed on paid administrative leave.

On December 28, 2015, the grand jury returned its decision declining to indict the police officers.

=== Timothy Loehmann ===
Loehmann, the officer who killed Rice, joined Cleveland's police force in March 2013. From July to December 2012, he worked with the police department in Independence, about 13 miles (21 km) south of Cleveland, with four of those months spent in the police academy.

In a memo to Independence's human resources manager, released by the city in the aftermath of the shooting, Independence deputy police chief Jim Polak wrote that Loehmann had resigned rather than face certain termination due to the concern that he lacked the emotional stability to be a police officer. Polak said that Loehmann was unable to follow "basic functions as instructed" and specifically cited a "dangerous loss of composure" that occurred in a weapons training exercise. Polak said that Loehmann's weapons handling was "dismal" and he became visibly "distracted and weepy" as a result of relationship problems. The memo concluded, "Individually, these events would not be considered major situations, but when taken together they show a pattern of a lack of maturity, indiscretion and not following instructions, I do not believe time, nor training, will be able to change or correct these deficiencies." It was subsequently revealed that Cleveland police officials never reviewed Loehmann's personnel file from Independence prior to hiring him. He had been hired in Cleveland despite listing his primary source of income for the prior six months having been derived from "under-the-table jobs".

On May 30, 2017, the mayor of Cleveland announced that Loehmann had been fired for concealing details about his past employment in his job application. On his application, Loehmann said that he had left the Independence Police Department for "personal reasons" and did not reveal the Independence police's determination that he had "an inability to emotionally function" as an officer.

=== Frank Garmback ===
Garmback, who was driving the police cruiser, has been a police officer in Cleveland since 2008. In 2014, the City of Cleveland paid US$100,000 to settle an excessive force lawsuit brought against him by a local woman; according to her lawsuit, Garmback "rushed and placed her in a chokehold, tackled her to the ground, twisted her wrist and began hitting her body" and "such reckless, wanton and willful excessive use of force proximately caused bodily injury." The woman had called the police to report a car blocking her driveway. The settlement does not appear in Garmback's personnel file.

== Aftermath ==
=== Investigation ===
The Cleveland Police Department received statements from both Loehmann and Garmback. They announced they were looking for additional witnesses to the shooting, including a man who was recorded walking with Rice in the park before the shooting. Their results would be presented to a grand jury for possible charges.

On January 1, 2015, the Associated Press reported that Cleveland police department officials were looking for an outside agency to investigate the Rice shooting, as well as handle all future investigations related to deadly use-of-force incidents.

On May 15, Mother Jones magazine reported that, six months after the shooting, while the sheriff's department announced that it had almost concluded its investigation of the shooting, neither of the two officers involved had yet been interviewed by investigators from the Cuyahoga County Sheriff's Office. It also reported that as of that time Frank Garmback, the officer who drove the police car, was not under criminal investigation.

On June 3, the Cuyahoga County Sheriff's Office released a statement in which they declared their investigation to be completed and that they turned their findings over to prosecutor Tim McGinty, who was expected to review the report and decide whether to present evidence to a grand jury. In response to a petition from citizens, on June 11 Municipal Court Judge Ronald Adrine agreed that "Officer Timothy Loehmann should be charged with several crimes, the most serious of them being murder but also including involuntary manslaughter, reckless homicide, negligent homicide and dereliction of duty." Judge Adrine also found probable cause to charge Officer Frank Garmback with negligent homicide and dereliction of duty. Because Ohio judges lack the legal authority to issue arrest warrants in such cases, his opinion was forwarded to city prosecutors and Cuyahoga County Prosecutor Timothy McGinty who, as of that date, had not yet come to a decision on whether to present the evidence to a grand jury.

=== Report ===
On June 13, Cuyahoga County Prosecutor Tim McGinty released a redacted 224-page report of the investigation. The report included interviews with at least 27 people, including teachers, friends, and the person that called 911. Loehmann and Garmback declined to be interviewed. Contradicting statements made by police that Loehmann shouted "show your hands" three times before firing, the report included accounts from several witnesses who claimed to have not heard officers issue any verbal warning to Rice.

=== Grand jury investigation and decision ===
On October 10, the Cuyahoga County prosecutor's office released two reports that McGinty had sought from outside experts about the use of force, one by retired FBI agent Kimberly Crawford, a second by Colorado prosecutor S. Lamar Sims; both reports concluded that the shooting of Tamir Rice was reasonable under the circumstances. However, amid accusations from lawyers representing the Rice family that McGinty had deliberately chosen Crawford and Sims because of their "pro-police bias" in order to cover for Loehmann and Garmback, McGinty convened a grand jury to consider whether or not criminal charges should be brought against the officers.

On December 28, McGinty reported that the grand jury had declined to indict Loehmann or Garmback, saying, "Given this perfect storm of human error, mistakes, and communications by all involved that day, the evidence did not indicate criminal conduct by police." The announcement prompted Rice's mother to release a statement accusing McGinty of mishandling the investigation, stating in part, "Prosecutor McGinty deliberately sabotaged the case, never advocating for my son, and acting instead like the police officers' defense attorney."

Three expert witnesses who testified before the grand jury criticized the prosecutors' behavior during the grand jury. Roger Clark, a retired LASD officer with expertise in police shootings, said that prosecutors at the hearing treated him with hostility and "disdain" for concluding that Loehmann and Garmback had acted recklessly; he also described the prosecutors as using theatrics, like none he'd ever seen in previous grand jury proceedings, which he believed were intended to lead the grand jurors to the conclusion that the prosecutors wanted them to reach. Jeffrey Noble, another retired police officer and expert in use-of-force cases (who had himself used deadly force on the job), said he was attacked by prosecutors for saying that the officers never should have escalated the situation by rushing Rice, adding, "I've definitely never seen two prosecutors play defense attorney so well." And Jesse Wobrock, a biomechanics expert hired by the Rice family's lawyers, also described the prosecutors as "acting in a way like they were defense attorneys for the cops" and as having attacked him professionally for his testimony regarding the timing and significance of body movements by Loehmann and Rice, as seen on video footage of the shooting. (A spokesman for McGinty's office said the three experts were only presenting "one side" of the story, but he could not elaborate because prosecutors are bound by grand jury secrecy laws.)

In the next Democratic primary for Cuyahoga County district attorney, in March 2016, McGinty lost to challenger Michael O'Malley, who received 55.8 percent of the vote. An analysis by cleveland.com claimed that McGinty won none of 282 majority African-American precincts.

=== Department of Justice ===
The United States Department of Justice decided on December 29, 2020, that it would not bring criminal charges against the two officers involved in the shooting. The Department said it did not condone the officers' actions, but there was not enough evidence to charge them with a crime. In particular, they pointed to the poor quality of the grainy video, which has no audio and is partially obstructed by a police car, as a reason for the decision not to prosecute.

=== Death suit and settlement ===
On December 5, 2014, Rice's family filed a wrongful death suit against Loehmann, Garmback, and the City of Cleveland in the United States District Court for the Northern District of Ohio. The eight-page complaint accused Loehmann and Garmback of acting "unreasonably, negligently [and] recklessly" and that "[h]ad the defendant officers properly approached Tamir and properly investigated his possession of the replica gun they would undoubtedly have determined ... that the gun was fake and that the subject was a juvenile." It also accused the City of Cleveland for failing to properly train both officers, as well as failing to learn about the Independence police department's internal memo about Loehmann.

On April 25, 2016, the lawsuit was settled in an effort to reduce taxpayer liabilities, with the City of Cleveland agreeing to pay Tamir Rice's family $6 million ($5.5 million to Tamir Rice's estate, $250,000 to Rice's mother, and $250,000 to Rice's sister).

=== Protests ===
In the wake of the shooting, protests and public outcry broke out in Cleveland, although they were relatively minor. However, on November 25, 2014, a day after a grand jury decision not to indict the police officer who fatally shot Michael Brown, the Cleveland protests became more prominent. That day, about 200 protesters marched from Public Square to the Cleveland Memorial Shoreway, causing the latter to be shut down temporarily. Rice's family pleaded with the protesters to remain peaceful in their activities, saying, "Again, we ask for the community to remain calm. Please protest peacefully and responsibly."

On December 5, Ohio Governor John Kasich established a task force to address community-police relations in response to Rice's shooting and other similar incidents.

Rice's death has been cited as one of several police killings which sparked the nationwide Black Lives Matter movement.

=== Media coverage ===
The incident received national and international coverage, in part due to the time of its occurrence, coming shortly after the recent police shooting of Michael Brown in Ferguson, Missouri; the death of Eric Garner in Staten Island, New York; the police shooting of Akai Gurley in Brooklyn, New York just two days before; the shooting of John Crawford III in Dayton, Ohio; and the subsequent unrest following these incidents had attracted worldwide attention.

The Northeast Ohio Media Group was criticized for publishing a news story on Rice's parents' criminal records.

A People's Archive of Police Violence in Cleveland was created in response to the killing of Tamir to document the community's experiences.

=== Funeral service ===
A funeral service for Rice was held at the Mount Sinai Baptist Church on December 3, 2014, with about 250 people in attendance. He was remembered "for his budding talents and described as a popular child who liked to draw, play basketball and perform in the school's drum line". Family members criticized Loehmann for acting too quickly in Rice's shooting.

=== Suspension of 911 dispatcher ===
On March 15, 2017, 911 dispatcher Constance Hollinger was suspended for eight days for failing to inform the responding officers that Rice was "probably a juvenile" and that the gun he had was "probably fake".

=== Timothy Loehmann ===
On October 5, 2018, the city of Bellaire, Ohio, hired Loehmann as a part-time officer. Five days later, Loehmann withdrew his application to the Bellaire police department, and his training ceased.

In 2022, Loehmann became the only policeman in the small department of Tioga Borough, Pennsylvania. He resigned after less than a week.

In 2024, Loehmann was hired as a probationary police officer for the city of White Sulphur Springs, West Virginia. On July 1, 2024, he resigned that position.

== See also ==
- List of unarmed African Americans killed by law enforcement officers in the United States
- Lists of killings by law enforcement officers in the United States
- List of killings by law enforcement officers in the United States, November 2014
- Shooting of Andy Lopez, another similar shooting involving a 13-year-old boy killed by a sheriff's deputy while holding an airsoft gun designed to resemble an AK-47 rifle.
- Private prosecution § Ohio
- Shooting bias
