= Glenville shootout =

1968 gun battle in Cleveland, Ohio, US

Glenville Shootout and Glenville Riots
- Part of the Black Power movement
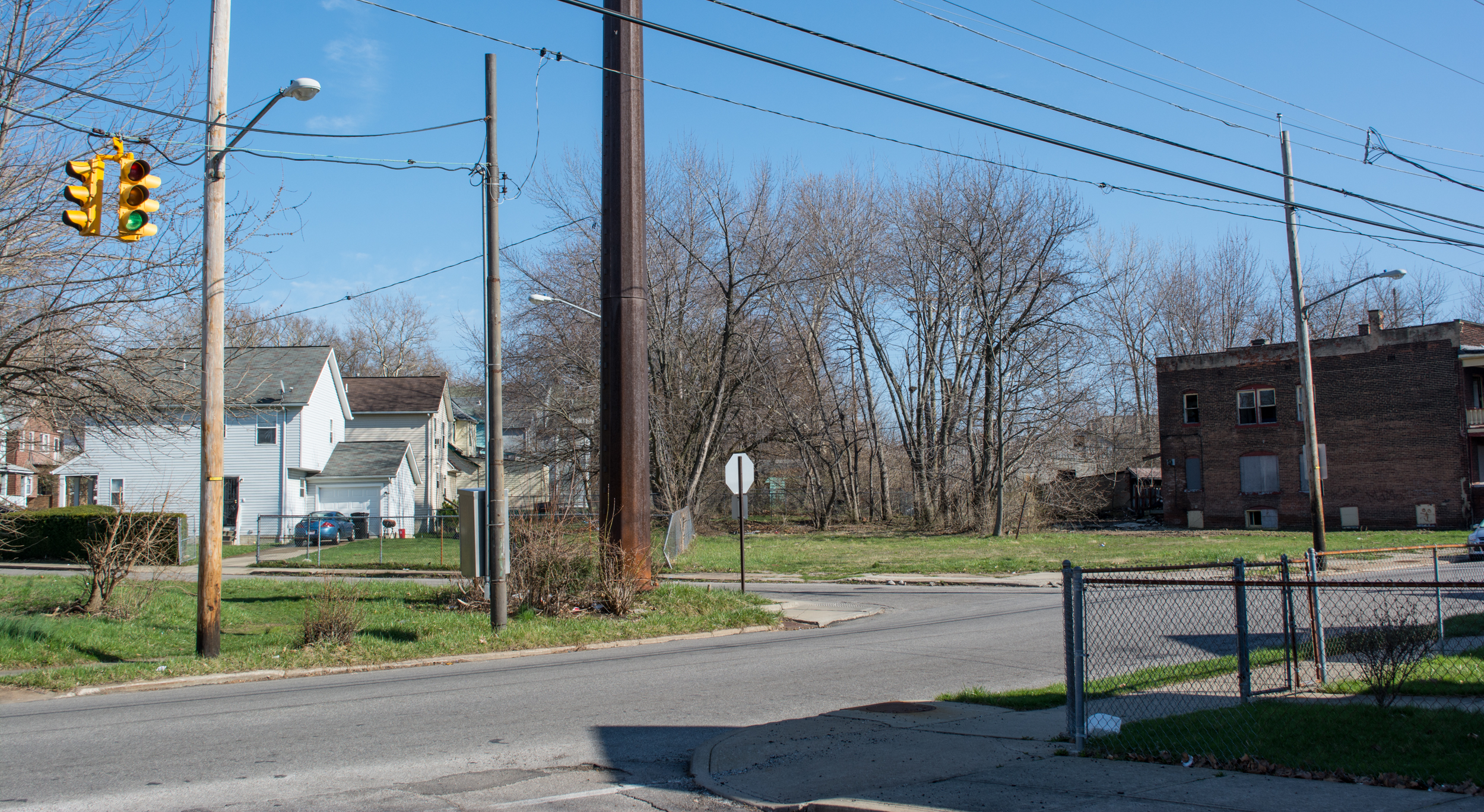
- Now-empty lot at the intersection of Auburndale Ave. and Lakeview Rd., where the Ahmed Evans house and Lakeview Tavern once stood
- Date: July 23–24, 1968 (gun battle); July 23–26, 1968 (riots)
- Location: Glenville neighborhood, Cleveland, Ohio; 41.5196°N 81.5999°W
- Caused by: Racial tension, poverty, racial segregation
- Methods: Firefight; Widespread rioting, looting, assault, arson, protests, property damage, murder

Parties
Black Nationalists of New Libya	Cleveland Police Department

Lead figures
Ahmed Evans (also known as Fred Evans)	None (gun battle)

Number
17 (gun battle); Several hundred to more than a thousand (riots)	Not known (gun battle); 125 police, 500 civilian patrolmen, 2,100 Ohio National Guard (riots)

Casualties and losses
Shootout: 3 killed 2 wounded Riots: 2 killed	Shootout: 3 killed 12 wounded one officer (Patrolman Thomas J. Smith) died of his injuries on March 9, 1993
- 1 civilian killed 2 wounded

The Glenville shootout was a gun battle that occurred on the night of July 23–24, 1968, in the Glenville section of Cleveland, Ohio, in the United States. Gunfire was exchanged for roughly four hours between the Cleveland Police Department and the Black Nationalists of New Libya, a Black Power group. The battle led to the death of three policemen, three suspects, and a bystander. At least 15 others (police, gunmen, and bystanders) were wounded.

The gun battle sparked the Glenville Riots, which began on the evening of July 23 as the gun battle was winding down, and continued through the evening of July 26–27. During the first day of the riots, the African American mayor of Cleveland, Carl Stokes, refused to allow white police officers to patrol the area. When African American leaders in the neighborhood were unable to quell the violence, Stokes sent the Ohio Army National Guard and the rest of the Cleveland Police into the area to stop the violence. The riots ended early in the morning on July 27. Losses due to the riots were about $2.6 million, and proved to be the political death knell of Mayor Stokes' Cleveland: Now! redevelopment effort. In 1969, Ahmed Evans, tried by an all- white jury was found guilty of murder and sentenced to death. His sentence was later commuted to life in prison.

== Racial tensions in Cleveland ==
The city of Cleveland suffered a significant loss of heavy industry beginning about 1950, which led to markedly higher unemployment. Meanwhile, large numbers of African Americans left the Deep South during the Second Great Migration. Cleveland saw a significant influx of blacks (who mistakenly believed the city was still a source of good jobs), but racial segregation and racially discriminatory housing practices left most African Americans able to find housing only in the city's eastern neighborhoods. The number of residents living there jumped from 150,000 in 1950 to 250,000 in 1960. Among the changing areas was the Glenville neighborhood. In 1950, Glenville was overwhelmingly white, middle-class, and Jewish. As these residents left for Cleveland's far eastern suburbs in the 1950s, (Note: Blockbusting greatly exacerbated this outmigration. This is a tactic of unscrupulous real estate agents, who convince racist white property owners that minorities will soon be moving into the neighborhood. These realtors then purchase white-owned homes at low prices from whites desperate to sell, and resell the homes at much higher prices to minority families.) single-family homes were turned into rentals, and thousands of African Americans moved in. By 1960, Glenville was overwhelmingly black and poor. Most people in Glenville also lived in crowded, substandard housing. Quite often, single-family homes in Glenville were subdivided into four or more apartments, each of which accommodated a large, extended family.

Racial tensions in Cleveland were exacerbated as the city began busing African American children to all-white schools in order to racially desegregate its schools and to reduce overcrowding in minority-majority elementary schools. Black parents were outraged when they discovered that their children were not eligible to participate in arts, sports, and after-hours activities at these schools. In January 1964, the United Freedom Movement, a coalition of black civil rights groups, decided to march on the Murray Hill School in the city's Little Italy neighborhood. When city leaders learned that local white residents intended to stop the march, they feared a riot would break out. The black civil rights groups were persuaded to cancel their protest. But the white mob still formed, and throughout the day on January 30, 1964, white citizens threw rocks and bottles and assaulted any African American person they found on the streets. The Cleveland Police made no arrests.

Cleveland's Black Power movement grew substantially in 1964 and 1965, as African American residents of the city viewed the Murray Hill riot as a symbol of their powerlessness. Despair bred extremism and violence. White and black gangs formed in the adjacent Superior-Sowinski area just west of Glenville, and physical assaults and gang wars occurred in broad daylight in the spring and summer of 1966. In July 1966, the week-long Hough Riots occurred throughout much of northeast Cleveland. Racial tension in the city worsened in the aftermath of these riots. A number of arsonists burned buildings and several stores were looted in the Hough neighborhood (the center of the riot) during the spring of 1967. Although many in the local and national media believed Cleveland was headed for another summer of violence in 1967, local African American anger appeared to be channeled politically instead. African American state legislator Carl Stokes unseated incumbent (and white) mayor Ralph S. Locher in the Democratic primary, and went on to win the mayoralty against white Republican attorney Seth Taft in November 1967.

== Radicalization of Ahmed Evans ==
Fred Evans was born in Greenville, South Carolina in 1931. His family moved to Cleveland in 1943. Evans dropped out of high school and enlisted in the United States Army in 1948. He served in the Korean War, where he won several medals for meritorious service. After suffering a severe injury when a bridge he was helping to build collapsed, he was discharged in 1952. He drove a city bus for two years, then reenlisted in 1954. He struck an officer, was court-martialed, and was sentenced to two years' hard labor and a dishonorable discharge. His sentence was later reduced to undesirable discharge, and he left the Army after just seven months. Army physicians had concluded that his 1952 injuries had left him with migraines, partial disability, epilepsy, and a personality disorder. He now suffered from severe rage issues which (under stress) he was unable to control, and that this, in part, had led to his confrontation with the senior officer. Evans returned to Cleveland and worked as a menial laborer for the Pennsylvania Railroad.

After seeing what he believed to be a UFO in the early 1960s, Evans turned to astrology for spiritual guidance. After his astrological mentor was hospitalized for insanity in 1966, Evans adopted the first name Ahmed, began wearing garments of an African design, and began preaching an increasingly militant form of black nationalism. About 1964 or 1965, he joined a group calling itself the Black Nationalists of New Libya. (Note: Some sources call the group the "Republic of New Libya", but Evans himself used the term "Black Nationalists of New Libya".) (Note: Evans and other sources make it clear that the New Libya group formed before Evans joined it and became its leader.) He opened the Afro Culture Shop and Bookstore on Superior Avenue, which drew the attention of local police because it often served as a gathering place for young black militants. The police closed his store three times in 1967 (ostensibly for sanitary violations, but Evans felt this was a pretense to harass him), and Evans assaulted African American Patrolman James Payne in April 1967. In March 1967, The Wall Street Journal reported that Evans had predicted that the United States would be consumed with violence on May 9, 1967. Although the media ridiculed Evans after his prediction failed to come to pass, Evans' status among local African Americans soared.

On May 1, 1968, Mayor Stokes announced that he was forming a $1.5 billion fund, named Cleveland: Now!, to completely redevelop the city of Cleveland within a decade. Money for the effort would be contributed by business, private foundations, the city, the state, and the federal government. Cleveland: Now! focused on job training, neighborhood and housing rehabilitation, education, youth development, health, welfare reform, and downtown revitalization. A significant number of grants were made immediately available to a wide range of neighborhood groups to help build civic pride, reduce racial tension, help end poverty, and for other aims. Ahmed Evans applied for and received a $10,300 grant from the city to help local youth learn African arts and crafts.

== Rumors of an uprising, and police surveillance ==
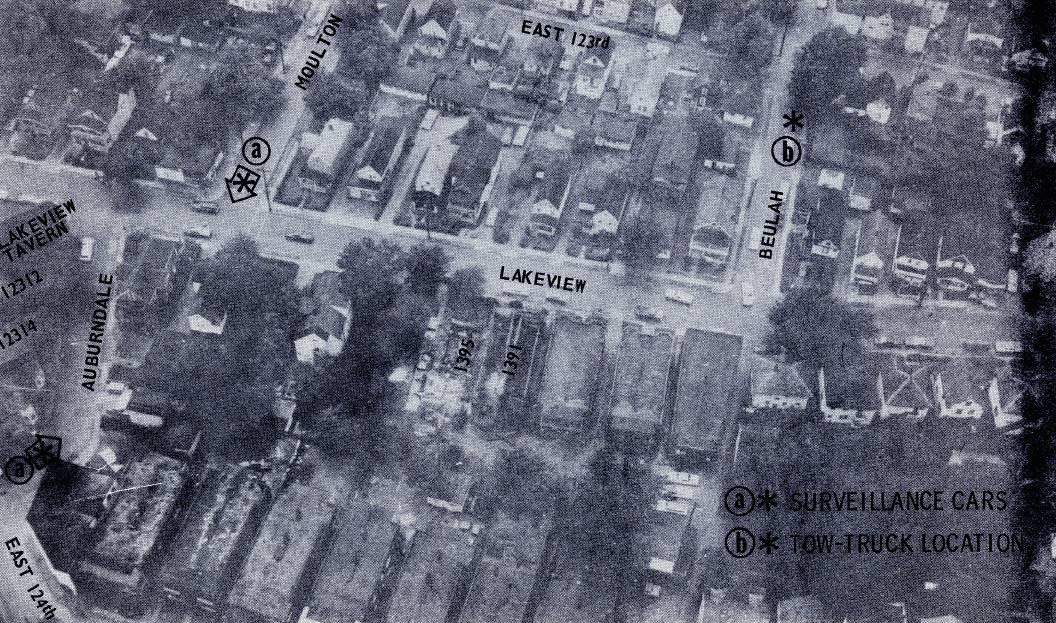
Aerial photograph of the area where the Glenville shootout occurred, showing the location of surveillance vehicles and the tow truck.

At 2:30 PM on July 22, 1968, Cleveland City Council member George L. Forbes and Mayor's Council on Youth Opportunities director Walter Beach met with Cleveland Police Inspector Lewis Coffey at Cleveland City Hall. Coffey said that the Federal Bureau of Investigation (FBI) had given the Cleveland police information that Ahmed Evans and his New Libya group were stockpiling weapons at Evans' home at 12312 Auburndale Avenue (Note: The house had been subdivided into apartments, and Evans was staying in one of these apartments.) in Glenville in preparation for assassinating several prominent African Americans (including Mayor Stokes) and instigating a general "uprising" on July 24. The police expressed doubt about these reports, as the sole source of information was a paid FBI informer who was not a member of Evans' group and who seemed under the influence of illegal narcotics. However, police subsequently discovered that black nationalists had been seen at a local department store the morning of July 22 inquiring about high-powered rifles and purchasing bandoliers of ammunition and first aid kits at an army surplus store. But it was unclear if these men belonged to Evans' group. (Note: At trial, the prosecution was able to establish that Evans and his group had purchased a number of weapons on July 22.) Furthermore, Evans was angry. He had just been told by his white landlord that he could no longer rent space for his Afro Culture Shop and Bookstore, (Note: The structure had no toilets and a nonfunctional furnace, and Evans had already made repairs to the structure. The elderly woman who owned the building estimated it would take $1,000 to make the necessary repairs to pass a building inspection, and she did not want to invest that money because she was attempting to sell the structure. When notified of his eviction, Evans continued to make repairs despite the woman's pleas.) and he had been served with an eviction notice to vacate his apartment on the morning of July 22. (Note: The apartment was not legally his to occupy. It had been rented by a 16-year-old boy named Leslie Jackson (also known as Osu Bey). Jackson was six weeks behind on his rent when his landlord began eviction proceedings against him on June 15. Jackson had also permitted as many as 16 to 20 people to sleep in the apartment each night, a violation of city housing regulations.)

At the meeting with Forbes and Beach, the police decided that a "roving surveillance" of Evans' home should be implemented. (Note: "Stationary surveillance" is when uniformed or plainclothes police sit in a stationary vehicle and watch a home or business. Because the streets near Evan's home were narrow, any parked car would draw attention. Furthermore, there were few African Americans on the Cleveland Police force, which meant that white officers would have to be part of the surveillance team. White men in a parked car would draw too much attention. It was also known that Evans sometimes sent out patrols of one to three men around his neighborhood, looking for police surveillance. A "roving surveillance", in which plainclothes police in automobiles moved in and out of the area without stopping, would draw much less attention but be just as effective.) Forbes and Beach also agreed to speak with Evans in an attempt to calm him down and attempt to address his grievances.

At 6:00 PM on July 23, Forbes and Beach drove to the Afro Culture Shop and Bookstore at 11105 Superior Avenue to see Evans. Not finding him there, they drove to the Evans' apartment at 12312 Auburndale Avenue and were surprised to discover that the Cleveland Police had, in fact, established a stationary surveillance around Evans' home. One unmarked car with white officers sat on Lakeview Avenue between Moulton and Auburndale, (Note: It is unclear where this vehicle was stationed. At one point, the official report says the vehicle was at Moulton and Lakeview, while at another point it says it was closer to the house at Lakeview and Auburndale. The two locations are less than 75 ft (23 m) apart.) and another with white officers sat at the intersection of Auburndale and E. 124th Street. At 7:50 PM, Forbes and Beach arrived at Evans' home. They talked with him for 15 minutes, during which time Evans expressed his anxiety about the police and his concern that he was going to be harassed again. Forbes attempted to have the stationary surveillance removed, but was advised by the city's Safety Director, (Note: The Director of Public Safety, also known as the Safety Director, is a cabinet-level officer who oversees the Cleveland Department of Public Safety. The Department of Public Safety includes divisions of animal control, emergency medical services, firefighting, emergency management, the city jail, and the city police.) James McManamon, to speak with Mayor Stokes. Forbes reached Stokes, but Stokes was interrupted by another call and asked Forbes to call back in 15 minutes. During this time, Forbes drove to the home of Harllel Jones, an Evans associate. While speaking with Jones, they learned that the shootout had begun.

== The shootout ==
It is not clear whether the police or the Black Nationalists of New Libya opened fire first. However, most press outlets stated that the Black Nationalists of New Libya initiated the gun battle.

=== Shots at the Evans house ===
According to police, shortly after Forbes and Beach left at 8:05 PM, an African American man with a carbine emerged from the Evans house and stood guard. A few minutes later, Evans and about 16 others, all of them heavily armed and wearing crossed bandoliers of ammunition, emerged from the house. The guard crossed the street and aimed his gun at the unmarked police vehicle sitting at Auburndale and E. 124th Street. The surveillants radioed for instructions, and at 8:20 PM were told to flee the area. The police vehicle turned right onto E. 124th Street, followed by a station wagon. The police claimed they heard a shot. The other police vehicle also fled the scene, turning right (south) onto Lakeview Avenue. The police in this car also said they heard several shots.

Cleveland Police Car No. 604 (a marked vehicle then at E. 123rd Street and Beulah Avenue) broadcast a report of shots fired at 8:24 PM.

A radio broadcast over the police radio alerted the second surveillance vehicle to the shots fired at the tow truck. It turned back, traveling east on Beulah. When it came within view of the tow truck, police say, they saw the tow truck driver running from an armed man. Then two snipers behind the tow truck fired on the unmarked police car (hitting its hood, grill, and windshield). The police returned fire, emptying their weapon ammunition magazines. The police vehicle then fled north on E. 123rd Street, all four of its tires shot out.

=== Attack on the tow truck ===
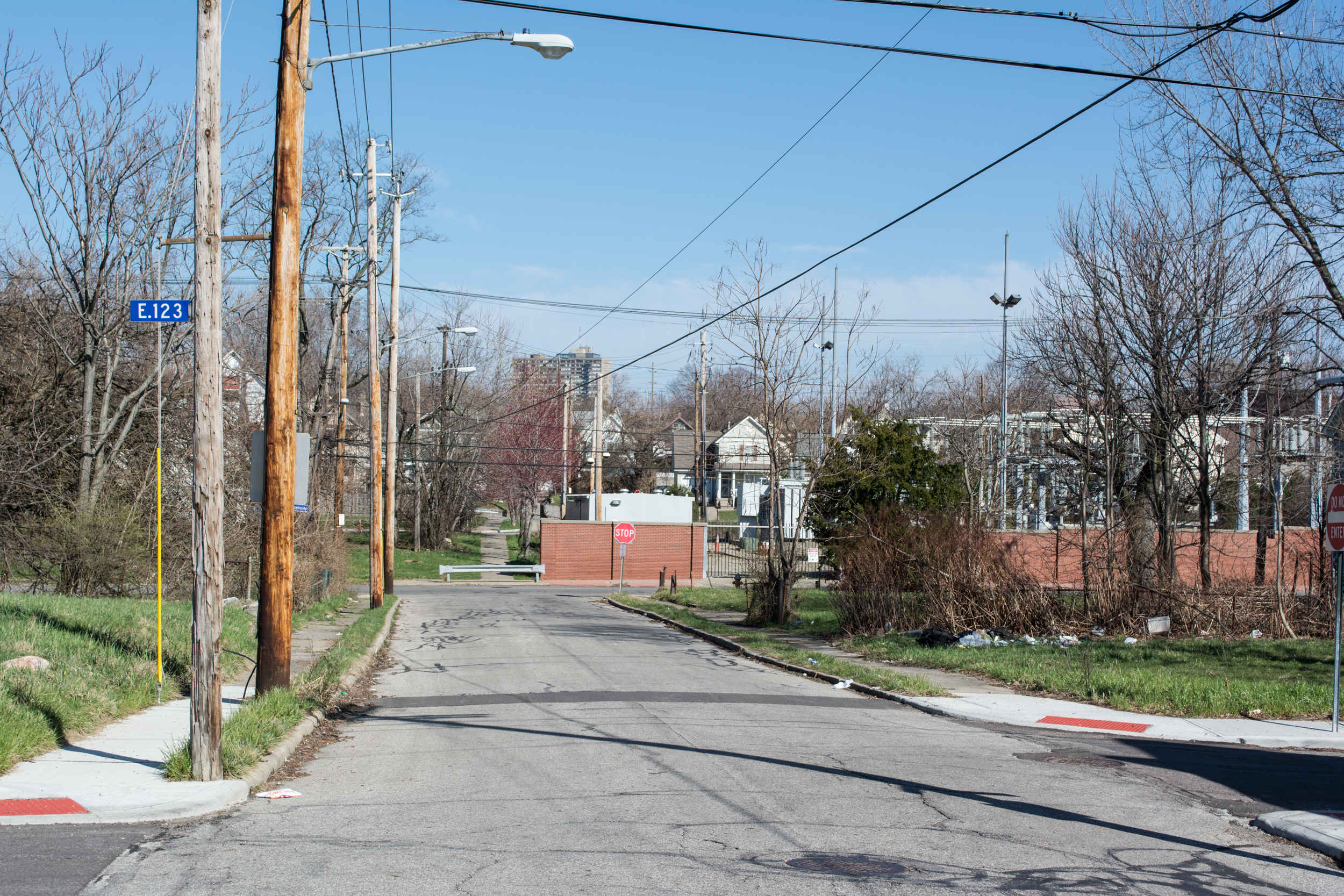
View of Beulah Avenue. The photographer was standing about where the abandoned vehicle was. The intersection in the distance is Beulah and Lakeview, where the four gunmen stood and suspect Leroy Harrison died. A power substation stands where 1391 and 1395 Lakeview once stood. The "alley" down which the gunmen fled is still visible.

Around noon on July 23, 1968, a call was made to the Cleveland Police reporting an abandoned vehicle on Beulah Avenue between E. 123rd Street and Lakeview Road. (Note: The car belonged to Henry R. Leftwich, who had loaned it to a friend several weeks earlier while Leftwich underwent long-term treatment for a back injury. The car broke down on Beulah Avenue on July 6, and Leftwich had done nothing to remove it.) The location was just a block north of Evans' home (at the intersection of Auburndale Avenue and Lakeview). The vehicle was ticketed at 1:25 PM, but a tow truck did not arrive until dusk. It parked on the north side of Beulah Avenue near the intersection with Lakeview Road. According to tow truck worker William McMillan, (Note: Tow truck workers are civilians, not police. But they wore Army-like jackets which local Cleveland residents often mistook for police uniforms.) the truck backed up to the abandoned car, and then McMillan got out. He was checking the license plate of the automobile a few moments later when a man with a shotgun standing at the corner of Beulah and Lakeview shot him in the back. An official chronology later placed the attack on McMillan at 8:25 PM. Another man hiding in the bushes near the front of the truck fired, and shot McMillan in the side. McMillan's coworker, still in the truck, radioed for help at 8:28 PM. According to McMillan, Ahmed Evans—armed with a carbine—walked on the sidewalk across the street and demanded to know if he was stealing cars. McMillan stood and said he had no weapons. He ran toward and then north up E. 123rd Street, and (he said) Evans shot him in the right side. An African American woman on E. 123rd Street gave refuge to McMillan.

Eyewitness testimony conflicted with some of these events. Residents on the street and others said that the two tow truck operators examined the abandoned vehicle for several minutes before shots were fired, contradicting McMillan's testimony that he was fired upon almost immediately after exiting the cab of his truck. Some residents also said that an African American man approached the tow truck operators and argued with them briefly before departing.

The federal government's official report on the Glenville shootout suggested that the tow truck was not a target of the New Libyans. Rather, it was "inadvertently trapped in the crossfire between police and snipers."

Evans later asserted that the tow truck was a ruse. He claimed police snipers were already in the area and targeting him and his followers for assassination. These snipers fired on Evans and his followers first, he said. He claimed he was nowhere near the tow truck when shots were fired. Instead, he said, he had left his home and was walking on west on Auburndale Avenue toward the Lakeview Tavern (a few feet around the corner to the south) when he heard shots "coming from the end of the street". A man ran past him. Evans said he ran north to Beulah in time to see the tow truck operator running toward E. 123rd Street. He said he heard submachine gun fire, and said he assumed this was the blast which killed Leroy Mansfield Williams. (Note: One eyewitness, who observed Evans walking up the west side of Lakeview Road toward Beulah Street, claimed that Evans was calm and collected as he did so.) (Note: Mansfield was later retrieved by friends and taken to Huron Road Hospital. He arrived at 9:25 PM, and was pronounced dead.) Evans admitted that he fired several shots from his carbine, but the weapon then jammed. He fled into the home at 1384 Lakeview Road.

=== The shootout begins ===
Several clearly-marked Cleveland Police cars arrived at the scene of the tow truck shooting about the same time that the second unmarked surveillance vehicle arrived. Police witnesses said that three men now stood on the two corners of Lakeview Road and Beulah Avenue, firing at the police cars. A fourth man—probably Leroy Mansfield Williams (also known as Amir Iber Katir)—lay dying on the sidewalk. Later estimates placed the time of his death at about 9:26 PM.

Most of the Glenville shootout occurred between 8:30 and 9:30 PM. It was contained in a small area, barely 300 yd (270 m) long, on Lakeview Road between Beulah Avenue and Auburndale Avenue. Lakeview Avenue is lined with residential homes, with narrow passages between them. When the police broadcast for assistance was made at 8:30 PM, it was an "all units" broadcast—which allowed any available police vehicle to respond. Within minutes, the side streets were clogged with police cars, abandoned there as officers arrived at the scene and ran on foot to the firefight. The police response was chaotic: Officers grabbed whatever weapon they could, and raced to the scene. Nearly all abandoned their radios in their vehicles. There was no law enforcement leadership present to control the police response. Gunfire centered around four locations: The tow truck, adjoining houses at 1391 and 1395 Lakeview Road, the Lakeview Tavern, and Ahmed Evans' apartment house at 12312 Auburndale Avenue.

Three marked Cleveland Police vehicles were the first to arrive on the scene at 8:30 PM, one on Beulah Avenue and two at the intersection of Auburndale Avenue and Lakeview Road. Patrolmen Kenneth Gibbons and Willard Wolff were the first to arrive at the intersection of Lakeview and Auburndale, at 8:30 PM. They claim to have observed a plainclothes police officer grappling with a young African American male in or near the front yard of the Evans home. As they exited their vehicle to assist, a rifle bullet struck the engine of their marked police vehicle. It exploded, killing Wolff and severely injuring Gibbons. Police Sergeants Sam Levy and Bill Moran arrived moments behind Gibbons and Wolff. They ran behind the duplexes at 1435 and 1439 Lakeview Road, and used the alley to get behind the Lakeview Tavern. They then moved down the driveway between the tavern and the Evans home to reach Auburndale Avenue. At this point, Moran was shot and dived behind a car parked on the street, where he was shot again. Levy found safety under the car.

Patrolmen Joseph McMannamon and Chester Szukalski were among the first uniformed officers to arrive at Beulah Avenue, approaching from the south on E. 123rd Street. The time of their arrival has been estimated as 8:30 PM. As they pulled in front of the tow truck, gunfire struck their vehicle from the south. As the men tried to escape out the driver's side door, Szukalski was hit. Severely injured, he crawled about 30 to 40 ft (9.1 to 12.2 m) toward a home and waited for help. McMannamon was lightly injured by bullet fragments. As more marked police cars arrived, the gunmen (Note: According to the testimony of police and tow truck driver McMillan, there were two groups of suspects: One or more gunmen on the south side of Beulah Avenue (who had shot at McMannamon and Szukalski) formed the first group, and four gunmen at the intersection of Lakeview and Beulah formed the second group.) ran east—moving across Lakeview Road into a narrow alley that is something of an extension of Beulah Avenue. As the gunmen fled, they exchanged gunfire with other police who had just arrived, then turned south down the alley to get behind 1395 Lakeview Road. Sources differ as to what happened next. Cleveland police claim the gunmen burst into the house, and occupied the second floor. Mrs. Beatrice Flagg and her children, living in the apartment on the first floor, fell to the ground to avoid being hit when police fired into the building. As the police pumped tear gas canisters into the home, the family fled. The police also claimed that the gunmen surprised Rev. Henry L. Perryman's wife, who fled with their nine-month-old son as the armed men seized her second-floor apartment. The police then occupied the first floor of 1391 Lakeview Road to use it as a base from which they could fire at the gunmen at 1395 Lakeview. But Mrs. Perryman denied that any gunmen burst in on her. She and Mrs. Flagg claimed they received no warning before police began firing guns at their homes and launching tear gas through the windows. A later press report gave a third version of events, saying the police ordered the apartments evacuated. After the Flaggs and Perrymans fled, the gunmen burst into the building and occupied the second floor.

At 8:35 PM, Patrolman Louis E. Golonka, attempting to navigate the narrow passage between 1391 and 1395 Lakeview, was shot and killed. Five minutes later, police, firing into the alley from the rear windows of 1391 Lakeview, killed Sidney Curtis Taylor (also known as Malik Ali Bey). At 8:45 PM, Bernard Donald (also known as Nondu Bey) stood up out of some bushes behind 1395 Lakeview and fired at police in the passage between 1391 and 1395 Lakeview. A patrolman picked up Golonka's shotgun and killed Donald.

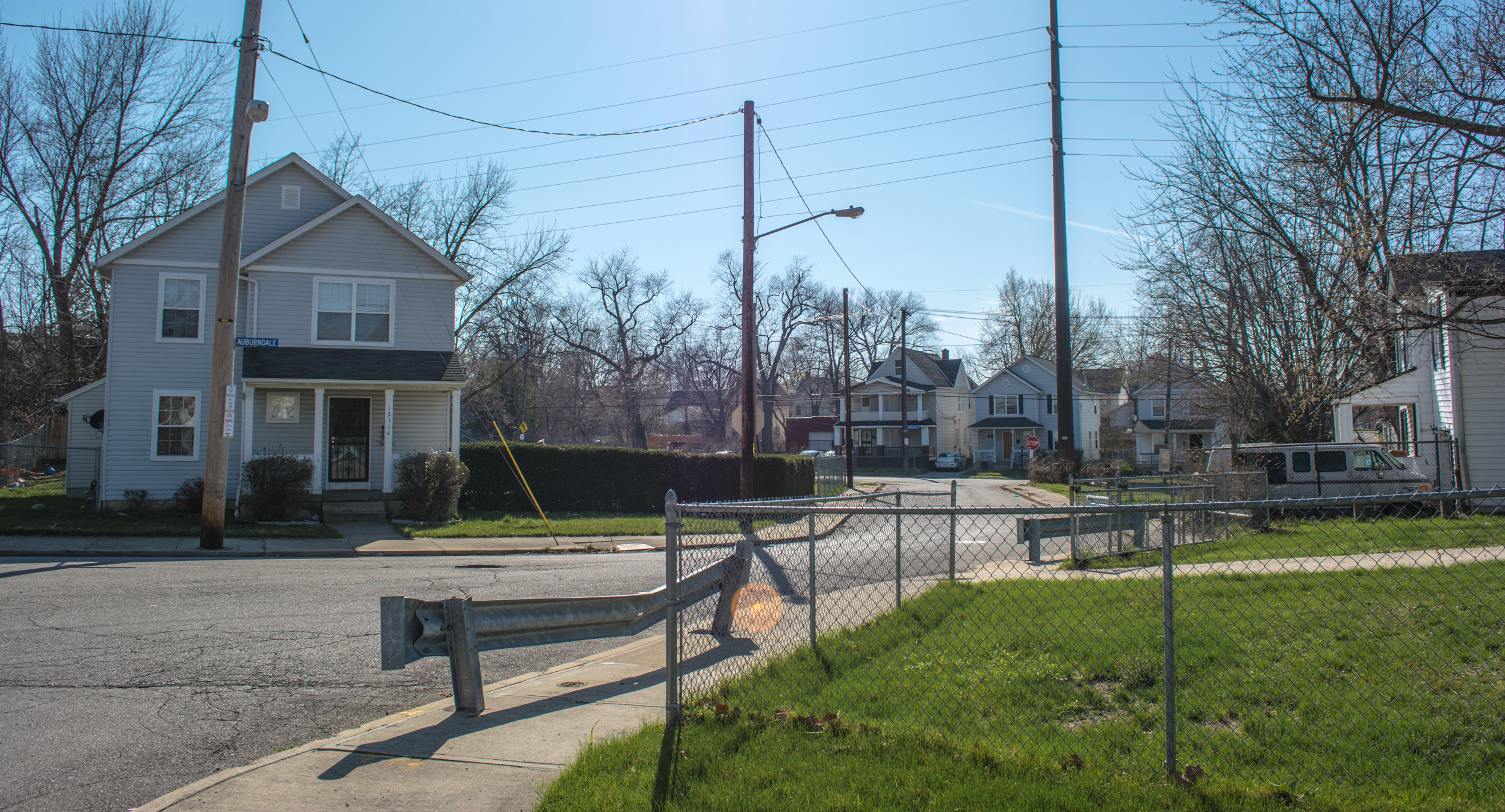
Standing at E. 124th Street (where the police surveillance car was parked), looking down Auburndale Avenue toward Lakeview Road. Lt. Jones died on the north sidewalk about midway down the block. Patrolman Wolff's vehicle exploded and killed him about where the hedges on the left are. Civilian James Chapman died in the middle of the street, about halfway down the block.

Lt. Leroy C. Jones and his partner arrived at the scene at about 8:40 PM, driving south on E. 124th Street. They parked and Jones ran around the corner onto Auburndale Avenue. Heavy gunfire rang out, and Jones fell dead in the middle of the block at 8:45 PM, lying on the sidewalk on the north side of the street. Patrolmen Angelo Santa Maria and Steve Sopko approached the scene from Auburndale Avenue about the time Jones died, but the number of abandoned police vehicles forced them to park two blocks away. Santa Maria ran behind the houses on the south side of Auburndale Avenue and spotted Jones lying on the sidewalk. Shouting to police hiding behind various types of cover on the north side of the street, he learned that it was Lt. Jones. Santa Maria asked for a volunteer among the many African American bystanders to drive a car along Auburndale, providing him with cover so he could retrieve Jones. Twenty-two year old clerk James E. Chapman agreed to help. According to a federal government report, Chapman's car could not get close enough to Jones due to the large number of abandoned police and civilian vehicles on Auburndale. (Note: In a 2010 interview, Santa Maria said that the reason why he asked for a civilian's help was that he believed the gunmen would not shoot at a vehicle driven by an African American. "You couldn't get to him with a police car because they would have shot it all up. So I asked for a volunteer, and this young man volunteered to drive me in. ... So I told him OK, when I get there I'll crawl out the back and drag the lieutenant in. ... We got there and Chapman says let's go get him. He decides to jump out of the car with me. We both went down, fatally for him, and I was fortunate enough to survive.") Both men got out of the car and tried to retrieve Jones. Santa Maria found cover next to a police sergeant who had a submachine gun. (Note: The Cleveland Police did not issue such weapons, and it was against regulations for an officer to possess one.) Throwing a smoke bomb to provide cover, Santa Maria ran to get Jones while the sergeant opened fire with his submachine gun. Santa Maria was shot in the back at 9:00 PM. Patrolman Steve Marencky later retrieved him and put him in an abandoned police car for safety. Chapman was shot in the head about the same time that Santa Maria was shot, and died instantly. (Note: It is possible Chapman was killed by police, not by gunmen. Conflicting medical testimony was presented at Evans' trial, some of which indicated Chapman was shot by a weapon just 6 in (15 cm) from his head. Since no suspects were in the street, the conclusion drawn by these experts was that a police officer shot Chapman.)

Lt. Elmer Joseph drove north on Lakeview Road and reached the intersection of Lakeview and Auburndale at 8:45 PM, about the time Moran and Levy came under fire. He was shot as he exited his vehicle, but managed to get to cover. Fifty-year-old resident Henry Orange was wounded by gunfire at about the same location and same time, as was Patrolman Richard Hart. Hart fell in the street on Auburndale, and was shot several more times by a sniper standing in a dark doorway.

Patrolman Leonard Szalkiewicz was shot and wounded at 8:55 PM while attempting to push an abandoned police vehicle off the street on Lakeview Road.

Sometime around 9:15 PM, police officers burst into the Lakeview Tavern and ordered the 10 staff and customers to lie on the floor. More police burst into the bar, and forced the seven men and three women into the basement. The officers fired repeatedly into the ceiling, and shot tear gas into the basement before locking the staff and customers in. Eyewitnesses said John Pegues, a tavern patron, was shot in the leg by police at this time, which an official chronology later said occurred at 9:30 PM. Patrolman Anthony Sherbinski, who rushed to the second floor to fire at snipers from the second floor window, was shot and wounded by return fire at the same time. The bar staff and patrons were not released from the basement until 10:15 PM. All the individuals were roughly handled by police, with most of the men being pistol-whipped. All ten were taken to the Fifth District Police station and locked up. Pegues was not given medical attention until 5:00 AM.

At about 9:30 PM, Patrolmen Thomas Smith and Ernest Rowell attempted to help Sgt. Sam Levy, who was pinned down by sniper fire near the car where he'd first been shot. Both men were shot and wounded trying to pick him up. About an hour later, another police officer accidentally set off a tear gas grenade nearby. Under cover of the cloud, Patrolmen William Traine and James Herron rushed with wheeled stretchers to retrieve Levy and Smith. Other police also helped, and the two were wheeled to a nearby ambulance.

By 9:45 PM, the shooting on Auburndale Avenue had ended. News media reported that 17 men and women were arrested at 12312 and 12314 Auburndale Avenue, but Evans was not among them. No dead or wounded were found in either house, and only four rifles. A fifth rifle was retrieved from a nearby automobile. Police initially charged only three people: John Hardrick, age 17; Leslie Jackson (also known as Osu Bey), age 16; and Alfred Thomas, age 18, all of whom were found at 12314 Auburndale (the home next to the Evans house). All three admitted to having fired their rifles.

The gun battle raging around 1395 Lakeview Road continued, however. Gunmen fired wildly in all directions from the upper floor windows. According to police, at one point a gunman stepped out of the house into the narrow passageway between 1395 and 1391 Lakeview, fired a few random shots, and went back inside. When he appeared at a kitchen window a few minutes later, police shot and apparently killed him (ending gunfire from the first floor of the structure).

At 11:11 PM, a police dispatcher advised all police in the area that a man at 1384 Lakeview Road wished to surrender to African American police. No one responded.

About midnight, the police stormed 1395 Lakeview Road. They were able to get inside, but a locked and barricaded door prevented them from reaching the second floor. Police also say they saw a body lying on the kitchen floor. Shortly afterward, the house caught fire. The cause of the fire was never determined, and the Cleveland Fire Department did not fight the blaze since it was believed firefighters would come under attack. Police observers later said they heard the names "Omar" and "Ali" shouted from within the home. 1391 Lakeview Road also caught fire, and both homes burned to the ground.

As the fires raged, Councilman Forbes, youth director Beach, Harllel Jones, and others had gathered to try to talk to the gunmen and bring calm to the neighborhood. Jones, wanting to ensure no one was caught inside the burning buildings, went behind the structures and retrieved the bodies of Sidney Curtis Taylor and Bernard Donald, as well as Donald's wounded brother, Lathan Donald (also known as Nondu-El). (Note: Evans considered Lathan Donald his primary assistant in the New Libya group.) According to Jones and his two companions, two uniformed white policemen (their badges removed) beat them in the passageway, telling them "Leave that nigger to die".

At 12:24 AM on July 24, a police dispatcher again issued a broadcast that a man at 1384 Lakeview Road wished to surrender to black officers. Three white policemen went to the home. The man identified himself as Ahmed Evans, and peacefully surrendered. The 11:11 PM and 12:24 AM police broadcasts were the only time 1384 Lakeview had been mentioned by any police officer over the radio during the evening. Evans was unarmed when apprehended. His jammed carbine was found in the bushes in front of the building where he was found.

No bodies were ever found inside either 1391 or 1395 Lakeview Road.

In addition to the seven deaths, 15 people (police, New Libyans, and bystanders) were injured in the shootout. It is possible that many more injured people (including gunmen) never sought treatment for their injuries and thus never were recorded on the official casualty lists. Some gunmen may have died and been borne away by friends, and it is probable that several snipers escaped.

== The Glenville Riots ==
=== Night of July 23–24 ===
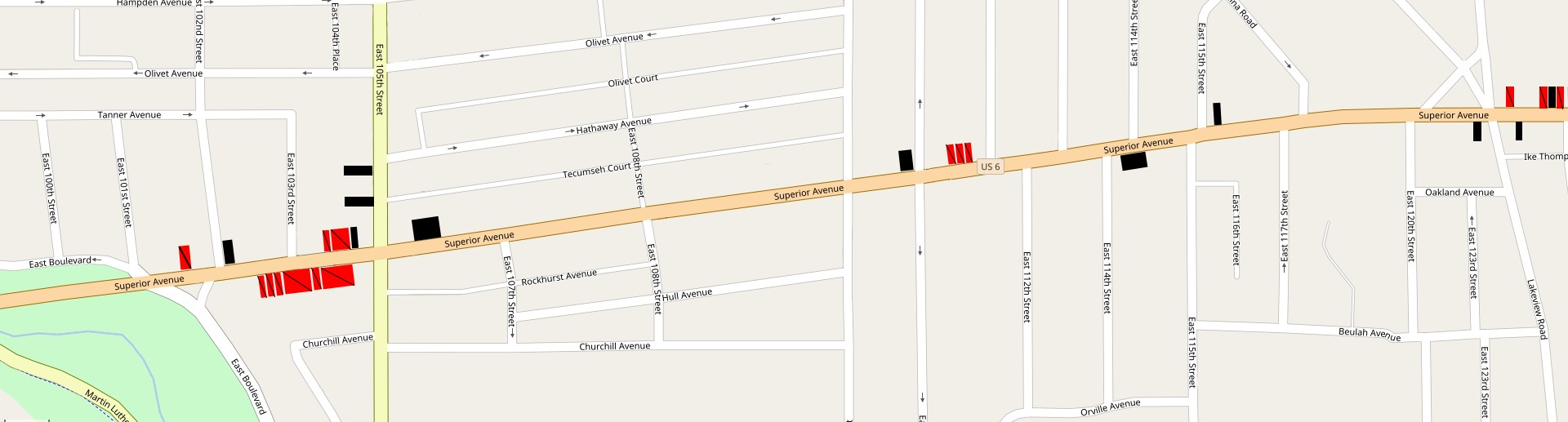
Businesses looted (in black) and looted as well as burned (in red with slash) along Superior Avenue between E. 100th and E. 125th Streets during the first night of the Glenville riots.

Crowds began to gather on Superior Avenue, a major city thoroughfare two blocks north of the gun battle, almost as soon as the shooting started. As police vehicles began racing down Superior Avenue to reach E. 120th Street, E. 123rd Street, Lakeview Road, and E. 124th Street, the crowd began throwing rocks at police and jeering them. At 9:15 PM, Mayor Stokes called Ohio Governor Jim Rhodes to inform him that a riot in Cleveland was likely. The governor called Major General Sylvester Del Corso, Adjutant General of the Ohio Army National Guard, and had the National Guard placed on alert. By 9:30 PM, the crowd numbered close to a thousand, mostly young adult, teenage, and pre-adolescent African American males. About this time, the Glenville riots broke out. A Molotov cocktail hit a marked police vehicle, causing it to burst into flames. A commercial panel truck, driving down Superior Avenue, was stopped by the crowd, the white driver brutally beaten, and the truck overturned and set afire. A black Cleveland Police officer, Herbert Reed, was pulled from his vehicle and savagely beaten. Two television news vehicles were also set aflame.

Mayor Stokes went on television to inform the public about the shootout and potential riot. He taped a brief message at WKYC-TV, telling people about the gunfight, and asking them to stay out of the area and remain at home. The mayor's message was broadcast shortly before 11:00 PM on all local television stations. Most Clevelanders learned of the incident after the mayor's message interrupted a baseball game between the Cleveland Indians and the Baltimore Orioles.

As they had done during the Hough riots, Cleveland Police withdrew from the area and formed a perimeter cordon. The mob moved west almost 1 mi (1.6 km) along Superior Avenue, looting stores. An entire block of buildings at E. 105th and Superior burned to the ground. The rioters also moved 1 mi (1.6 km) north, reaching St. Clair Avenue. Small bands of rioters and arsonists even moved into Hough as far west as E. 55th Street.

About midnight, Mayor Stokes formally requested National Guard assistance in quelling the riot. More than 4,000 Guardsmen were mobilized, and 1,500 were sent to Cleveland that night. Through the early morning of July 24, area firefighters attempted to respond to blazes, but were pelted with rocks and bottles. They then stopped responding unless given a police escort. During the night, fire departments responded to 15 fires set by vandals, as well as several false alarms and a handful of non-riot related fires. (Note: The Cleveland Fire Department contested this official count of the fires. It claimed the local fire departments had responded to 50 to 60 fires, most of them on Superior Avenue. Twenty of these were considered "major" fires, involving one or more buildings.) At 3:00 AM, about 200 Ohio Army National Guardsmen, assisted by 24 Cleveland Police officers, began patrolling Glenville. (Note: There were three Guardsmen and one Cleveland Police officer to a Jeep. All reports of looting or gunfire were reported directly to the National Guard, and the Guard and police were instructed to arrest rioters without using deadly force.)

During the night, 28 African Americans were arrested, three-quarters of them for looting. According to eyewitnesses, about midnight, two white men in an automobile shot at three young black men waiting for a bus at E. 79th Street and St. Clair Avenue. Twenty-two-year-old Clifford Miller was hit in the head, and died. Thirty-year-old African American security guard James C. Haynes was found dead from multiple shotgun wounds behind a building at 8203 Superior Avenue shortly after midnight. He may have been killed by police. (Note: Haynes guarded an apartment building at 1270 E. 83rd Street. He'd confronted a group of African American youth who tried to gain entry to his building, firing a warning shot in the air with his pistol. The youth dispersed. Police radios broadcast two reports: One at 11:45 PM of two officers trapped in a burning building at E. 82nd and Superior, another at 11:50 PM of two officers pinned down by snipers at a building at E. 82nd and Superior. The source of these reports was never identified. Several marked police vehicles raced to the Afro Set headquarters at 8127 Superior Avenue (between E. 82nd and E. 83rd Streets). Cleveland Law Director Clarence L. "Buddy" James, Jr. (the top legal officer for the city) had been on the scene of the Glenville shootout since about 9:00 PM. He had stationed an African American patrolman at the Afro Set office to help calm militants meeting there. According to eyewitnesses, police in Car 351 arrived at a gas station at the corner of Superior and E. 83rd Street and began shooting without provocation at Haynes' apartment building 100 ft (30 m) or so to the north. Another police car drove down the alley behind 1270 E. 83rd (the alley where Haynes was found dead). James, arriving at the scene moments later, claimed that the police in Car 351 refused to obey his orders to remain on site and attempted to flee the scene. James says he followed in another police vehicle, alternately and repeatedly using a bullhorn and the police radio in an attempt to make Car 351 come to a halt. James later said that when he finally was able to stop Car 351, it was running without its headlights on. The officers in Car 351 denied that they had done any shooting, even though shells from their weapons littered the ground and the apartment building at 1270 E. 83rd Street was riddled with holes from police gunfire. Eyewitnesses and James have implied that the police shot Haynes. Despite a promise from the Cleveland Police Department, no investigation appears to have been made of this incident.)

=== July 24 ===
At 8:30 AM on July 24, Stokes met with 100 African American civic leaders at City Hall to discuss ways to prevent the violence from flaring up again. Although no consensus for action emerged, most of the attendees felt that continued police presence would merely inflame tensions, and a few felt that a curfew would do little except build resentment while not preventing outsiders from coming into the area to make trouble. Early in the afternoon, a group of about 20 African American civic leaders (most, but not all, militants) suggested to Stokes that the black community be allowed to try to quell the violence on their own. A similar strategy had been proposed by a handful of black leaders during the night and at the 8:30 AM morning. At a meeting with Councilman Forbes and others held about 3:00 PM, Stokes discussed this plan. There was general agreement to try it, although General Del Corso was skeptical that it would succeed.

During the day, there were scattered reports of looting and the hawking of stolen goods, to which Cleveland police responded. Although a temporary ban on the sale of liquor had been imposed throughout Cuyahoga County some time during the night, a few bars in the cordoned area were fined and closed for violating the ban.

At 4:15 PM, Stokes announced his plan for handling the riots. The area encompassed by Euclid Avenue, E. 55th Street, Superior Avenue, Rockefeller Park, St. Clair Avenue, and the Cleveland-East Cleveland border would be cordoned off at 7:00 PM. The National Guard and a unit of police officers would patrol the perimeter. A normal police patrol, consisting of 125 African American patrolmen, (Note: Another source says 100 African American police, assisted by an unspecified number of African American Cuyahoga County Sheriff's Department deputies.) would roam the interior of the area. Another 109 representatives of local African American civic and neighborhood groups, assisted by 500 African American volunteers, would assist the police in keeping the area calm. This group of volunteers was called the "Mayor's Committee". Nonresident whites would be refused entry to the area, as would white news media.

Overnight, roving bands of youth set 10 fires and engaged in sporadic looting. (Note: A press release by the city on July 25, 1968, listed just three fires.) Civilian patrols were unable to control the looting, much of which was done by young adults and teenagers (some as young as 10 years of age). Against Mayor Stokes' direct orders, several white police officers and National Guardsmen violated the cordon during the night and responded to reports of looting. This created such a tense situation at a furniture store at E. 123rd Street and St. Clair Avenue that Law Director Buddy James had to race to the scene and intervene. White Cleveland Police were deeply embittered by Stokes' decision to keep them out of the affected area. When a plea for an ambulance for a heart attack victim came in, an anonymous policeman said over the police radio, "White or nigger? Send the Mayor's Committee." When a child in the cordoned-off area fell from a second-floor balcony, an anonymous policeman radioed, "Tell the Mayor's Committee to handle it." When a police dispatcher asked for police to respond to a fire, an anonymous policeman radioed, "Tell the Mayor to go piss on it." Repeatedly, when asked to do their duty, anonymous policemen would radio back "Fuck that nigger Mayor!" When police at the Fifth District Headquarters (which encompassed the affected area) (Note: The Fifth District headquarters was located at Chester Avenue and E. 107th Street.) were told they could not carry rifles while patrolling the perimeter, those police present "responded in a flurry of curses and epithets" directed at Stokes. The anger at Stokes lasted throughout the evening, creating great tension at the Fifth District.

At a press conference on the morning of July 25, Mayor Stokes announced that 36 stores had been looted and 13 looters arrested (nearly all of them teenagers) during the night, and no persons had been shot or seriously injured.

=== July 25 ===
Regular public transit service and trash pickup through the cordoned area resumed the morning of July 25, and city demolition crews began tearing down the most severely affected and unsafe burned buildings.

Early on the morning of July 25, Stokes met with African American civic leaders who had participated in the Mayor's Committee effort. For the most part, only militant groups had participated in the peace patrols. Moderate neighborhood leaders, like pastors, had largely stayed home, and the militants and some other African American civic leaders deeply resented the lack of participation by moderates. There was general agreement that the Mayor's Committee had been only partially effective, and a curfew was discussed. While the group debated, Stokes left the room and held a press conference at which he announced the National Guard would once more patrol Glenville's streets. The mayor's announcement left many African American leaders feeling betrayed. Other black officials and white business owners criticized Stokes for using the Mayor's Committee patrols in the first place, which they viewed as a complete failure. (Note: General Del Corso initially said on July 25 that the citizen patrols were "beginning to be productive. It is proving successful." But on August 9, 1968, he told the Ohio Crime Commission that Stokes had "surrendered to black revolutionaries".)

After the mayor's announcement, 400 National Guardsmen moved into the cordoned-off area and began patrolling again. (More than 3,100 National Guardsmen were now in the Cleveland area.) The National Guard responded to (sporadic) reports of looting during the day, while police enforced the liquor ban. At 6:30 PM, Stokes announced he was imposing a curfew in the area from 9:00 PM to 6:30 AM. The National Guard would continue to patrol inside the restricted zone, and the ban on white police patrols was lifted. Several local African American leaders and volunteers also agreed to assist by roaming the affected area.

More than 2,100 National Guardsmen patrolled Glenville during the night of July 25–26. (Note: Mayor Stokes initially wanted only 400 Guardsmen in the area at night, the same number which had patrolled during the day. General Del Corso demanded an "all or nothing" approach, and Stokes consented to using all 2,100 Guardsmen on hand.) No additional deaths occurred, although there was still looting. A major fire erupted on E. 55th Street, and four minor arsonist fires were put out near the eastern end of Superior Avenue. Thirty people were arrested (one for arson, two for looting, the rest for curfew violations). After a band of 100 youths formed in the Lee-Miles neighborhood far from Glenville, the National Guard was sent there to disperse them.

=== July 26 ===
Cuyahoga County lifted the ban on alcohol sales outside of Cleveland on the morning of July 26, and Mayor Stokes announced that the curfew that night would begin at midnight (to allow the public to attend a Cleveland Indians home baseball game). In the afternoon, 35 Cleveland Police and 100 National Guardsmen surrounded the Esquire Hotel at 10602 Superior Avenue after police received a tip that several gunmen from the July 23–24 shootout were hiding there. No gunmen were found.

The National Guard continued to patrol Glenville during the night of July 26 – 27. Police arrested Harllel Jones and a group of his followers late on July 26 at the Afro Set headquarters at 8127 Superior Avenue. (Note: Afro Set was a black nationalist group founded in 1967 by Jones.) After claiming to find brass knuckles on him, they searched his automobile without a search warrant and claimed to find a .38 caliber revolver. Mayor Stokes arrived as Jones was being arrested. Police later changed their report, and said brass knuckles were found in Jones' vehicle. A court threw out the case because the search was an unconstitutional violation of the Fourth Amendment. After Jones was taken to a local police precinct for booking and Stokes had left, eyewitnesses said police vandalized the group's offices. Few other incidents occurred during the night of July 26 – 27.

=== July 27: End of the riots ===
The ban on alcohol sales in Cleveland was lifted on the morning of July 27. The National Guard were withdrawn, Cleveland police were returned to their normal shifts and patrol patterns, and the curfew was lifted. The riots cost local business $2.6 million ($24,071,770 in 2025 dollars). The damage was far more widespread than the much better-known Hough riots.

On the morning of July 27, the media reported that Evans had received a $6,000 grant from the mayor's Cleveland: Now! redevelopment fund, and that he had used a portion of this money to buy weapons. The revelation during the riots that Evans had used Cleveland: Now! funds to purchase weapons ended political and business support for Mayor Stokes' redevelopment campaign.

One more serious incident of violence occurred at 2:30 AM on July 28. An African American youth got into an altercation with a security guard at the Haddam Hotel at E. 107th Street and Euclid Avenue. A crowd gathered, with black youth urging the crowd to riot. Cleveland Police responded in force, and a police riot broke out. NBC News photographers Julius Boros and Charles Ray were brutally beaten by a large number of police when they attempted to film and photograph the incident. Law Director Buddy James and Councilman George Forbes rushed to the Fifth District police headquarters, where James witnessed disturbing signs that the police intended harm toward the two men (who had been fingerprinted and jailed). (Note: At first, police refused to allow James to enter the Fifth District headquarters, even though he was the city's top legal officer. James witnessed an unusually high number of lieutenants and captains on site, who all claimed to be doing paperwork. All African American patrolmen had been ejected from the station. Most police had removed their badges, and the few badges visible were unnumbered.) An African American policeman accompanying James and Forbes quietly told them that African Americans were being brutally beaten in the station's parking garage. James demanded treatment for Boros. After examination at Lakeside Hospital, Boros was given pain medication. Dissatisifed, James ordered Boros transferred to Metropolitan General Hospital. This transfer was aborted by NBC attorneys while it was in process, and Boros was returned to Lakeside Hospital where he received no medical care for the several hours. James demanded that Boros be released, but the Cleveland Police delayed doing so repeatedly. When Boros was finally remanded into James' custody and examined near dawn at Lutheran Hospital, he was found to have broken ribs, a ruptured spleen, a fractured back, a broken tooth, and extensive cuts and abrasions. Boros was charged with assaulting an officer; he was swiftly acquitted in January 1970. The Cleveland Police declined to investigate the police riot at the Haddam Hotel, the attacks on Boros and Ray, the lack of medical treatment given to Boros, or the insubordination shown to James.

== Legal and other outcomes ==
=== Trial of Ahmed Evans ===
Evans was indicted in August 1968 for the murders of Leroy C. Jones, Louis E. Golonka, Willard J. Wolff, and James E. Chapman. The charges were later altered to "kill by shooting" (an easier charge to prove). The prosecution's case rested on state laws which said that a conspirator is guilty of the crimes which his co-conspirators commit. The prosecution's case was largely circumstantial, but after deliberating for two days the jury returned a verdict of guilty on all counts on May 12, 1969. Evans was sentenced to death in the electric chair. Evans was incarcerated at Lucasville Correctional Facility, and appealed his conviction. His execution was stayed while he appealed. While his appeal was pending, the United States Supreme Court placed a moratorium on all capital punishment in the United States in its ruling in Furman v. Georgia, 408 U.S. 238 (1972). Evans' conviction was commuted to life in prison, and he spent the remainder of his life at Lucasville. Evans was diagnosed with cancer in 1977, and he died on February 25, 1978, at Riverside Methodist Hospital in Columbus, Ohio.

=== Other convictions and civil suit ===
Lathan L. Donald (age 19), Alfred Thomas (age 18), John Hardrick (age 17), and Leslie Jackson (age 16) were each indicted on August 25, 1968, on seven counts of first-degree murder, 11 counts of shooting to wound; and possession of a machine gun. Donald and Hardrick were also charged with possession of illegal narcotics. Hardrick and Thomas were detained in the Cleveland City Jail after their arrest.

After a psychiatric hearing, Alfred Thomas was judged insane and unable to stand trial. He was committed to Lima State Hospital for the Criminally Insane.

After three and a half days of deliberation, a jury convicted Lathan Donald on August 18, 1969, of three counts of first-degree murder (by conspiracy), and four counts of second-degree murder (by conspiracy). After considering a plea for mercy, the jury granted the plea. Donald was sentenced to seven consecutive terms in prison, without the possibility of parole. His sentence meant that he would spend a minimum of 110 years in prison.

Leslie Jackson appealed his indictment. His attorneys argued that, under Ohio law, a Juvenile Court was required to find a juvenile delinquent, as well as determine that the juvenile could not be rehabilitated under the juvenile justice system, before that juvenile could be turned over to the Court of Common Pleas for indictment as an adult. His case went to the Supreme Court of Ohio, which in 1970 nullified the indictments against him in In re Jackson, 21 Ohio St.2d 215 (Ohio 1970). The ruling had the effect of nullifying Hardrick's indictments as well. Hardrick and Jackson were then charged with delinquency for wounding Lt. Elmer Joseph during the shootout. Assistant Cuyahoga County Prosecutor Charles R. Laurie declined to have the pair re-indicted by the Court of Common Pleas, as the two "were not ring leaders and besides, many key witnesses are no longer available." After hearing evidence that a rifle used by the two was employed to wound Lt. Joseph, Cuyahoga County Juvenile Court Judge Walter G. Whitlatch sentenced Hardrick and Jackson to the Mansfield Youth Center in Mansfield, Ohio. Both individuals were to be released on their 21st birthday.

The convictions of Hardrick and Jackson were the last legal actions taken against any individual charged in the Glenville shootout.

In 1971, eight Cleveland police officers and tow truck worker William McMillan sued the city of Cleveland for $8.8 million, arguing that the Stokes administration had negligently paid money to black militants which led directly to their injuries. After more than six years, during which several judges oversaw the case, Common Pleas Judge John C. Bacon ordered the case to trial. After the plaintiffs had finished presenting their case for three weeks, Judge Bacon dismissed the suit, finding that the plaintiffs had offered no evidence showing that Stokes or the Cleveland: Now! trustees knew that payments were going to Evans or other black nationalists. (Note: Mayor Stokes had approved all Cleveland: Now! expenditures, while Cuyahoga County Commissioner Seth Taft and Cleveland businessman George J. Grabner were trustees of the Cleveland: Now! foundation. Cleveland: Now! gave money to the Greater Cleveland Associated Foundation, which in turn gave a grant to the Council on Youth Opportunity. Council chairman Dean G. Ostrom in turn gave a grant to the Hough Area Development Corporation (HADC), a community foundation working to improve business and living conditions in the Hough neighborhood. HADC director DeForest Brown and trustee Julian C. Madison (a local architect) oversaw distribution of funds to Evans. Judge Bacon held that only Brown and Madison knew that funds would go to Evans, and dismissed the case against the other defendants. Testimony from Evans, Donald, and others showed that no HADC funds were misused or diverted to purchase weapons. Rather, the militants used their paychecks to obtain guns, which could not have been foreseen by Brown or Madison. Judge Bacon strongly criticized attorney Milt Schulman, who represented the nine plaintiffs, all but accusing him of legal malpractice as well as threatening him with contempt of court for his misbehavior during the trial.)

=== Police reforms ===
White police on the Cleveland force reacted bitterly toward Stokes after the Glenville shootout, blaming him for supporting radicals like Evans and for providing him with the funds to arm himself. Police began anonymously taunting Stokes and hurling racial epithets at him over police radios. At a police union meeting on August 1, 600 police voted overwhelmingly to demand the resignation of Public Safety Director James McManamon. In an attempt to turn the police department around, Stokes agreed in September 1968 to establish Cleveland's first SWAT unit, so that the police could deal with situations like the Glenville shootout in which there was heavy gunfire and entrenched gunmen. He also agreed to hire 500 new police officers, purchase 164 new patrol cars, and establish a police training academy. The National Association for the Advancement of Colored People began urging African Americans to apply for the new positions, and Police Chief Blackwell agreed to racially integrate all police patrols in the Glenville neighborhood.

On October 9, Stokes dismissed Police Chief Michael J. Blackwell for being unable to improve morale in the force and rein in the racial tension, and announced a $17 million overhaul of the police department. Patrick L. Gerity, a 48-year-old police deputy inspector, was named Chief of Police.

== See also ==
- Civil Rights Movement
- List of incidents of civil unrest in the United States

== Bibliography ==
- Colburn, David R.; Adler, Jeffrey S. (2001). African-American Mayors: Race, Politics, and the American City. Urbana, Ill.: University of Illinois Press. ISBN 9780252026348.
- Committee on Internal Security (1973). "Revolutionary Target: The American Penal System. House Rept. No. 93-738. U.S. House of Representatives. 93rd Cong., 1st sess". U.S. Congressional Serial Set. Washington, D.C.: U.S. Government Printing Office. hdl:2027/mdp.39015087629534.
- Keating, W. Dennis (1994). The Suburban Racial Dilemma: Housing and Neighbourhoods. Philadelphia: Temple University Press. ISBN 9781566391481.
- Keegan, Frank L. (1971). Blacktown, U.S.A.. Boston: Little, Brown & Co.
- Masotti, Louis H.; Corsi, Jerome R. (1969). Shoot-Out in Cleveland: Black Militants and the Police. A Report to the National Commission on the Causes and Prevention of Violence. Washington, D.C.: U.S. Government Printing Office.
- Miller, Carol Poh; Wheeler, Robert A. (1997). Cleveland: A Concise History, 1796–1996. Bloomington, Ind.: Indiana University Press. ISBN 9780253211477.
- Moore, Leonard N. (2002). Carl B. Stokes and the Rise of Black Political Power. Urbana, Ill.: University of Illinois Press. ISBN 9780252027604.
- Parker, Thomas F. (1974). Violence in the U.S. Volume 2: 1968–71. New York: Facts on File. ISBN 9780871962294.
- Squires, Gregory D. (2008). "Blockbusting". In Schaefer, Richard T. (ed.). Encyclopedia of Race, Ethnicity, and Society. Los Angeles: SAGE Publications. ISBN 9781412926942.
- Tittle, Diana (1992). Rebuilding Cleveland: The Cleveland Foundation and Its Evolving Urban Strategy. Columbus, Ohio: Ohio State University Press. ISBN 9780814205600.
- Wiese, Andrew (2005). Places of Their Own: African American Suburbanization in the Twentieth Century. Chicago: University of Chicago Press. ISBN 9780226896410.
- Williams, Reginnia N. (2007). "Cleveland (Ohio) Riot of 1966". In Rucker, Walter C.; Upton, James Nathaniel (eds.). Encyclopedia of American Race Riots. Vol. 1, A–M. Westport, Conn.: Greenwood Press. ISBN 9780313333019.
- Williams, Rhonda Y. (2015). Concrete Demands: The Search for Black Power in the 20th Century. New York: Routledge. ISBN 9780415801423.
- Zieger, Robert H. (2007). For Jobs and Freedom: Race and Labor in America Since 1865. Lexington, Ky.: University Press of Kentucky. ISBN 9780813124605.
