= Cotner =

Cotner is a surname. Notable people with the surname include:

- Charles Cotner, plaintiff in Cotner v. Henry, a US court case
- June Cotner (born 1950), American author
- Keoke Cotner (born 1971), American golfer
- Mercedes R. Cotner (1905 - 1998), American politician

== See also ==
- Cotner College, a former religious college
