= 1971 Cleveland mayoral election =

- November 2, 1971
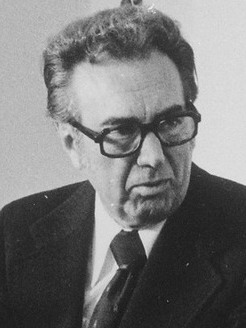

Nominee	Ralph Perk	Arnold R. Pinkney	James M. Carney
Party	Republican	Independent	Democratic
Popular vote	88,744	72,785	65,877
Percentage	38.73%	31.76%	28.75%
Mayor before election
Carl Stokes
Democratic
Elected mayor
Ralph Perk
Republican

The Cleveland mayoral election of 1971 saw the election of Ralph Perk.

This was the last officially partisan mayoral election in Cleveland. Subsequent elections have used a nonpartisan system.

== Nominations ==
Primaries were held on September 28.

=== Democratic primary ===
1971 Cleveland mayoral Democratic primary
Party	Candidate	Votes	%
Democratic	James M. Carney	74,031	52.76%
Democratic	Anthony J. Garofoli	60,141	42.86%
Democratic	Patrick L. Gerity	6,149	4.38%
Turnout		140,321	

=== Republican primary ===
1971 Cleveland mayoral Republican primary
Party	Candidate	Votes	%
Republican	Ralph Perk	12,156	66.95%
Republican	George Voinovich	6,000	33.05%
Turnout		18,156	

== General election ==
1971 Cleveland mayoral election (general election)
Party	Candidate	Votes	%
Republican	Ralph Perk	88,744	38.73%
Independent	Arnold R. Pinkney	72,785	31.76%
Democratic	James M. Carney	65,877	28.75%
Socialist Labor	Joseph Pirincin	1,740	0.76%
Turnout		229,146	
