= 1967 Cleveland mayoral election =

- November 7, 1967
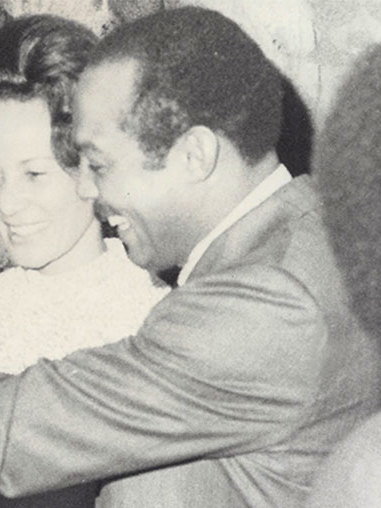

Nominee	Carl Stokes	Seth Taft
Party	Democratic	Republican
Popular vote	129,318	127,467
Percentage	50.36%	49.64%
Mayor before election
Ralph S. Locher
Democratic
Elected mayor
Carl Stokes
Democratic

The Cleveland mayoral election of 1967 saw the election of Carl Stokes.

Stokes was the first elected African American mayor of a major American city (Cleveland was, at the time, the ninth largest city in the United States). His election came alongside the election of Richard G. Hatcher in the 1967 Gary, Indiana, mayoral election. Together, these were the first elections of African-Americans as mayors of cities over 100,000. Stoke's election came in a city which was, at the time, 68% white.

== Nominations ==
Primaries were held on October 3.

=== Democratic primary ===
Stokes unseated incumbent mayor Ralph S. Locher in the Democratic Party primary.

1967 Cleveland mayoral Democratic primary
Party	Candidate	Votes	%
Democratic	Carl Stokes	110,769	53.68%
Democratic	Ralph S. Locher (incumbent)	92,033	44.60%
Democratic	Frank P. Celeste	3,545	1.72%
Turnout		206,347	

== General election ==
1967 Cleveland mayoral election (general election)
Party	Candidate	Votes	%
Democratic	Carl Stokes	129,318	50.36%
Republican	Seth Taft	127,467	49.64%
Turnout		256,785	
