= Cleveland: Now! =

Cleveland: Now! was a public and private funding program for the rehabilitation of neighborhoods in Cleveland, Ohio initiated by Mayor Carl B. Stokes on May 1, 1968. Local businesses agreed to cooperate with the Stokes administration on the program "to combat the ills of Cleveland's inner city in order to preserve racial peace." The aim of the Now! was to "raise $1.5 billion over 10 years with $177 million projected during the first 2 years to fund youth activities and employment, community centers, health-clinic facilities, housing units, and economic renewal projects."

The program's funding aims were quickly met within the first few months of its initiation. However, on July 23, 1968, the Glenville Shootout occurred. Subsequent revelations found that Fred "Ahmed" Evans, one of the major instigators in the incident, had indirectly received some $6,000 in funds from the program. Donations declined. However, Stokes pulled through and was reelected for a second term in 1969. The Now program continued to actively operate until 1970. Stokes announced that its "last major commitment would be the funding of 4 new community centers." The organization was not formally dissolved until George V. Voinovich assumed office in 1980. The city donated the remaining $220,000 to the Cleveland Foundation to "use for youth employment and low-income housing."
