= 1973 Cleveland mayoral election =

- November 6, 1973
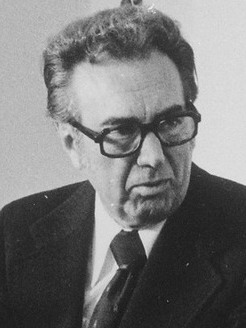

Nominee	Ralph Perk	Mercedes Cotner
Party	Nonpartisan	Nonpartisan
Popular vote	90,350	45,267
Percentage	66.62%	33.38%
Mayor before election
Ralph Perk
Republican
Elected mayor
Ralph Perk
Republican

The Cleveland mayoral election of 1973 saw the reelection of Ralph Perk.

This was the first Cleveland mayoral election to use a nonpartisan system.

== Primary election ==
=== Candidates ===
- James M. Carney, businessman and 1971 Democratic Party nominee for mayor
- Ralph Perk, incumbent mayor
- Joseph Pirincin, 1971 Socialist Labor Party nominee for mayor
- Robbie Scherr

=== Results ===
Primary election results
Candidate	Votes	%
Ralph Perk (incumbent)	56,560	54.92
James M. Carney	44,459	43.17
Robbie Scherr	1,126	1.09
Joseph Pirincin	838	0.81
Total votes	102,983	100

== General election ==
On October 11, James M. Carney withdrew from the race, citing "personal" reasons. Carney's campaign committee selected then-City Council Clerk Mercedes R. Cotner to replace him on the ballot.

=== Results ===
Cleveland mayoral election, 1973
Candidate	Votes	%
Ralph Perk (incumbent)	90,350	66.62
Mercedes Cotner	45,267	33.38
Total votes	135,617	100
