= Ralph Perk =

American politician (1914–1999)

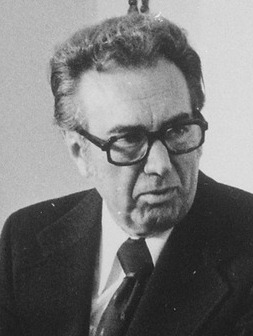
- Perk in 1973

52nd Mayor of Cleveland
- In office November 9, 1971 – November 14, 1977
- Preceded by: Carl B. Stokes
- Succeeded by: Dennis J. Kucinich

Personal details
- Born: Ralph Joseph Perk; January 19, 1914 Cleveland, Ohio, U.S.
- Died: April 21, 1999 (aged 85) Westlake, Ohio, U.S.
- Party: Republican
- Children: 7
- Occupation: Politician, lawyer

Ralph J. Perk (January 19, 1914 – April 21, 1999) was an American politician who served as the 52nd mayor of Cleveland from 1972 to 1977. A member of the Republican Party, he was Cleveland's first Republican mayor in approximately 30 years. Before becoming mayor, Perk represented the city's 13th Ward on the Cleveland City Council from 1953 to 1961 and served as auditor of Cuyahoga County from 1962 to 1971.

Perk became mayor during a period of population loss, industrial decline and financial strain in Cleveland. His administration promoted regional government, helped establish the Greater Cleveland Regional Transit Authority, transferred the city's sewage-treatment system to a regional district, expanded Cleveland Hopkins International Airport, introduced a citywide emergency ambulance service and participated in the construction of the Cleveland Justice Center. His government also relied heavily on federal grants for public employment, crime prevention, housing and redevelopment.

Perk was reelected twice but was eliminated in Cleveland's 1977 nonpartisan mayoral primary, finishing behind Democrats Dennis Kucinich and Edward F. Feighan. His final years in office were dominated by disputes over the city's finances, public-employee layoffs, a proposed downtown transit system and the future of Cleveland's municipally owned electric utility, commonly known as Muny Light.

== Early life ==
Perk was born on January 19, 1914, at 4422 East Clark Avenue in Cleveland. His parents were Mary B. Smirt and Joseph C. Perk, a garment worker and organizer for the International Ladies' Garment Workers' Union. Perk was a second-generation American of Czech and Slovak ancestry and grew up in Cleveland's Broadway–Fleet neighborhood. He was a lifelong member of Our Lady of Lourdes Roman Catholic Church.

As a child, Perk delivered newspapers and sold ice from a horse-drawn wagon. He graduated from Our Lady of Lourdes School in 1927 and attended East Technical High School from 1927 to 1929, when he left without graduating. He subsequently worked as a floor sweeper, an employee of Apex Electric Manufacturing Company and an apprentice wood-pattern maker. During the early 1930s he briefly pursued professional boxing, winning four fights at local clubs. In 1934 he co-founded the Kovaar and Perk Coal and Ice Company.

Perk married Lucille Gagliardo on May 4, 1940. They had seven children, including Cleveland councilman Ralph Perk Jr., and eventually had 19 grandchildren and four great-grandchildren. Perk received a military exemption during World War II because of recurring kidney stones, but contributed to wartime production as a pattern maker who constructed full-scale engine models. He later attended Cleveland College at Western Reserve University intermittently, studying subjects that included political science.

== Political career ==
Beginning in 1953, Perk was elected to five two-year terms on Cleveland City Council from the city's Ward 13, representing his native Broadway–Slavic Village neighborhood. During his service on Council, Perk founded the American Nationalities Movement, an umbrella agency for 35 nationality groups. In 1962, he was elected auditor of Cuyahoga County, the first Republican to win countywide office since the mid-1930s; he was re-elected in 1966 and 1970. In 1965 and 1969, Perk ran for mayor of Cleveland and was defeated both times in the general election. In 1971, Perk won the Republican nomination for mayor for the third time. He defeated future mayor, governor, and U.S. Senator George Voinovich, then a member of the Ohio House of Representatives, in the primary. Perk went on to win the general election, "propelled into office by a heavy ethnic [Eastern European] vote." He became the first Republican to serve as mayor of Cleveland since the 1940s, and proceeded to make future mayoral elections nonpartisan. He was reelected in 1973 and 1975.

== Mayor of Cleveland ==
=== Election and administration ===
Perk ran for mayor for a third time in 1971. He defeated state representative George Voinovich in the Republican primary and won the general election with 38.7 percent of the vote in a three-candidate contest against Arnold Pinkney and James M. Carney Jr. His campaign slogan asked Clevelanders to have faith in themselves and in their city rather than simply placing their faith in him.

Perk formed what he described as a coalition administration, appointing Democrats and Republicans as well as representatives of Cleveland's ethnic and racial communities. His campaign agenda included cleaner air and water, new police and fire facilities, a citywide ambulance service, free public transportation for senior citizens, airport expansion, restoration of Playhouse Square, reduced crime and regional management of transit, sewers, water, parks and port facilities.

The new administration immediately confronted financial problems. A Price Waterhouse review estimated that the city faced a deficit of approximately $26 million. Perk announced layoffs and furloughs, froze employee pay and reduced his own mayoral salary by 10 percent. He later faced repeated disputes with public-employee unions and City Council over wages, staffing and service reductions.

Perk was reelected in 1973 and 1975, becoming Cleveland's first three-term mayor since Anthony J. Celebrezze. From 1973 through 1977 he chaired the National Conference of Republican Mayors and Municipal Elected Officials, and he served on the board of the United States Conference of Mayors and the National League of Cities.

=== Regional government and transportation ===
Regional government was a central element of Perk's political program. In 1972, Cleveland sold its sewage-treatment facilities for $32 million as part of the formation of the Northeast Ohio Regional Sewer District. The new district pursued a multiyear capital-improvement program and federal funding for flood control and wastewater treatment.

Perk also advocated replacing the financially troubled Cleveland Transit System with a countywide authority. His administration helped draft state legislation allowing the city and county to create a regional transit agency supported through public taxation. The Greater Cleveland Regional Transit Authority was established in 1975 with an initial base fare of 25 cents and free transportation for senior citizens.

Near the end of his administration, Perk supported a federally financed elevated downtown transit project known as the People Mover. The proposal was opposed by several county officials, including Voinovich, who considered it excessively costly. The project became one of the issues cited in accounts of Perk's declining political support in 1977.

=== Public safety and municipal services ===
In 1972, Cleveland was selected for the federal Impact Cities Program and received approximately $20 million for a crime-reduction initiative aimed at assaults, burglaries and robberies. The program financed projects including an auxiliary police force. In 1973, Perk announced that Cleveland's reported crime rate had fallen by 26 percent over the preceding two years.

Perk's administration introduced Cleveland's first citywide emergency ambulance service, transferring emergency medical transportation from the police department to a civilian unit. It also participated with Cuyahoga County in completing the Cleveland Justice Center, which included new police and court facilities.

The administration oversaw a major expansion of Cleveland Hopkins International Airport. A long-term financing agreement supported a $55 million expansion within a broader $100 million airport financing plan. Construction included an enlarged passenger terminal, which opened during Perk's final year in office.

=== Federal funding and development policy ===
Perk maintained close relationships with officials in the Nixon, Ford and Carter administrations and repeatedly sought federal assistance for Cleveland. Federal programs financed crime prevention, housing rehabilitation, public employment, community development, transit and infrastructure. By 1975, critics noted that federal money accounted for nearly half of the city's approximately $150 million budget.

Perk supported downtown development through federal grants, infrastructure spending and property-tax abatements. Projects undertaken or advanced during his administration included the Bond Court Hotel, the National City Center, renovations to Public Hall and continued restoration of Playhouse Square. His use of tax abatements for major downtown projects became controversial during his final campaign, with opponents arguing that the policies favored large developers over Cleveland neighborhoods.

=== Campaign for the U. S. Senate and re-election defeat ===
In 1974, Perk won the Republican nomination for the United States Senate seat formerly held by William B. Saxbe, who had resigned to accept the appointment to the office of United States Attorney General. Perk, however, was defeated soundly by former NASA astronaut and Democrat John Glenn. Perk had stated that he was counting on running against the incumbent senator, Howard M. Metzenbaum, who had been recently appointed to the seat by then Governor John J. Gilligan. Metzenbaum lost the primary to Glenn. Subsequently, in 1977, Perk suffered an upset defeat in the non-partisan primary for mayor, finishing third behind Dennis Kucinich, a former political ally, and Edward F. Feighan. Kucinich prevailed over Feighan in the general election, setting the stage for his subsequent mayoralty.

=== Gaffes ===
As mayor, Perk was also known for his many political gaffes. On October 16, 1972, he accidentally set his hair on fire when he attempted to use a welder's torch for a ribbon-cutting ceremony for the American Society for Metals at the Cleveland Convention Center. A spark from the torch had "hit his head and his hair caught fire thanks to a product that a barber put in it earlier in the day." The mayor later jested, "There are more hazards to this job than I expected." For this, the media proclaimed Perk to be the "hottest mayor in the country" and even Cleveland native Bob Hope joked about the incident.

In another incident, Perk's wife, Lucille, famously rejected an invitation from First Lady Pat Nixon to an event at the White House in order to attend her regular bowling night. Later, Perk explained his wife's comment to mean that she was unable to attend because the invitation had come too late and she was unable to prepare for travel. Perk was rumored to say, "tell them it's your bowling night." Though the remark brought howls of laughter throughout the city, it endeared the Perks to their ethnic Eastern European voter base. In yet another gaffe, Perk suggested that a study on pornography ought to be conducted by municipal sanitation workers.

=== Controversy ===
Perk also appointed Richard Eberling in 1973 to chair a committee to redecorate the mayor's office in City Hall, a move that proved unpopular with numerous sources. In 1974, The Plain Dealer exposed Eberling's record as a petty criminal in a front-page story; Perk defended Eberling, and approved the financing of project until the amount significantly over-reached the budgeted amount. Eberling's lover, Obie Henderson was hired as Perk's personal secretary. Eberling was later found guilty in the death of Ethel M. Durkin, a Cleveland area widow; he also linked himself to the Marilyn Sheppard murder in Bay Village, in 1954. Circumstantial evidence also links Eberling to at least four other murders committed over a period from 1946 to 1970 that involved his stepfather, his purported girlfriend, and both of Mrs. Durkin's sisters.

== Personal life ==
Perk and his wife had six sons and a daughter. His son, Ralph J. Perk, Jr., served as a municipal court judge in Cleveland from 1989 to 2003. Another son, Thomas Perk, is a council member in the village of Valley View in addition to being a fire fighter. Yet another son, Kenneth Perk, is a member of the Cuyahoga Heights Board of Education. His second-youngest son, Allen G. Perk, is the president and CEO of XLNsystems Inc. in Columbus, Ohio.

Perk was diagnosed with prostate cancer in the 1990s, and underwent treatments for the disease. The treatment was thought to have been successful, but in early 1998 Perk and his family learned that the cancer had not only returned but had spread. Perk's children spent a year caring for their father at home. Five days before his death, Perk was admitted to the Corinthian Skilled Nursing Center in Westlake, Ohio. He died there on April 21, 1999. He was buried at Holy Cross Cemeteryin Brook Park, Ohio.

== See also ==
- List of mayors of Cleveland
- History of Cleveland
- Greater Cleveland Regional Transit Authority
- Cleveland Public Power

Party political offices
Preceded by William B. Saxbe	Republican nominee for U.S. Senator from Ohio (Class 3); 1974	Succeeded by Jim Betts
Political offices
Preceded by Carl B. Stokes	Mayor of Cleveland; 1972–1977	Succeeded by Dennis J. Kucinich
