= Ralph S. Locher =

American judge

50th Mayor of Cleveland
- In office 1962–1967
- Preceded by: Anthony J. Celebrezze
- Succeeded by: Carl B. Stokes

Personal details
- Born: Ralph Sidney Locher; July 24, 1915 Moreni, Dâmboviţa County, Kingdom of Romania
- Died: June 18, 2004 (aged 88) Beachwood, Ohio, United States
- Citizenship: American; Romanian
- Party: Democratic
- Occupation: Politician, lawyer

Ralph Sidney Locher (July 24, 1915 – June 18, 2004) was a Romanian-born American politician of the Democratic Party who served as the 50th mayor of Cleveland, Ohio.

== Life and career ==
In 1915, Locher was born in the oil-producing Romanian town of Moreni, northwest of Bucharest. His father, a Swiss-American, represented Standard Oil in the country from 1906. His mother was a Regat German native to Romania. The family left for the United States in 1928, after the father retired.

Locher graduated from Bluffton College and was admitted to the Ohio bar. He became a close associate of Frank J. Lausche, later governor of Ohio and U.S. senator, who nurtured his career, first appointing him as secretary of the Ohio State Industrial Commission in 1945. They were instrumental in building the "cosmopolitan Democrats" movement of urban ethnic voters. Locher was law director of Cleveland under Mayor Anthony J. Celebrezze beginning in 1953, then succeeded him as mayor when Celebrezze was appointed United States Secretary of Health, Education, and Welfare by President John F. Kennedy on July 14, 1962. Ohio Attorney General Mark McElroy was expected to win the Democratic nomination in the primary election held on October 2, but Locher won the nomination in an upset. Locher easily won election to the remainder of Celebrezze's term in a general election held on November 6.

After completing Celebrezze's fifth term, Locher served two full terms of his own as mayor of Cleveland. In 1965, Locher banned all rock concerts at Public Hall and other city-owned venues following a near-riot at a Rolling Stones performance. His tenure was marked by increasing racial tensions in the city, culminating in the Hough Riots of 1966. On April 25, 1967, Locher declared that three recent visitors to the city – Floyd McKissick, national director of the Congress of Racial Equality (CORE), Alabama governor George C. Wallace, and civil rights leader Martin Luther King Jr. – were "extremists."

On October 3, 1967, Locher lost the Cleveland Democratic primary election to Carl B. Stokes, who he had narrowly defeated in the 1965 general election. Stokes went on to defeat Republican Seth Taft in the general election, becoming the first African American mayor of a major U.S. city.

Locher went on to be elected a probate court judge in 1970, and was elected to the Ohio Supreme Court in 1977, serving two terms. Though a Democrat, he became increasingly conservative as he got older and with longevity in office frequently voting with Republican justices on worker's compensation and other employment issues. He died at his home in Beachwood, Ohio, on June 23, 2004. He was interred at the Old Stone Church columbarium in Cleveland, Ohio.

== Notes ==
Political offices
Preceded by Anthony J. Celebrezze	Mayor of Cleveland; 1962–1967	Succeeded by Carl B. Stokes
Legal offices
Preceded by Leonard J. Stern	Ohio Supreme Court Justice; 1977–1989	Succeeded by Alice Robie Resnick
