= Charlie Brown (Indiana politician) =

American politician from Indiana

Member of the Indiana House of Representatives from the 3rd district
- In office 1982–2018
- Preceded by: Dean R. Mock
- Succeeded by: Ragen Hatcher

Personal details
- Born: March 8, 1938 (age 88) Williston, South Carolina
- Party: Democratic
- Spouse: Angela
- Education: Cheyney University, Indiana University
- Occupation: Educator, youth and mental health administration, politician

Charlie Brown (born March 8, 1938) is a former American politician who is a Democratic member of the Indiana House of Representatives representing the 3rd District (1982–2018). Brown, who is African-American, is a member of the Indiana Black Legislative Caucus. In 2017, Brown announced that he would not be running for reelection to the State House.

== Early life ==
On March 8, 1938, Brown was born in Williston, South Carolina. Brown grew up in Philadelphia.

== Education ==
In 1961, Brown earned a bachelor's degree from Cheyney University of Pennsylvania (formerly Cheyney State Teachers' College), a public historical Black institution, in Cheyney, Pennsylvania. In 1982, Brown earned a master's degree from Indiana University Northwest.

== Career ==
In 1961, Brown became a teacher at the Gary Community School Corporation until 1968.

From 1968 to 1988, Brown was youth coordinator, Mayor's assistant on youth activities, director of the Youth Services Bureau, affirmative action officer and risk manager for the City of Gary.

In 1982, Brown became a member of the Indiana House of Representatives for District 3.

In 1988, Brown became the CEO of the Gary Community Mental Health Center, a position he held until 1993.

Brown is a consultant providing health and management services to entities seeking to foster positive interaction between governmental bodies and the community.

=== Politics ===
First elected to the Indiana House of Representatives in 1982, Brown has been a chairman of the Indiana House Standing Committee on Public Health.

In 2007, Brown sponsored a bill enacting a new statewide effort to promote improved health care for Hoosiers. Known as the Indiana Checkup Plan, House Enrolled Act 1678 (Public Law 218–2007) provides expanded health insurance availability, improved prenatal care for expectant mothers and a bipartisan effort to encourage establishment of wellness programs among Indiana employers of all sizes.

In 2010, Brown announced a partnership he initiated between the Gary Community Health Center and a medicaid dentist. "This is a first that is starting here in Gary, Ind., that we have a private sector entity joining with the public and producing a service that is sorely needed," Brown said. "This goes to show you that Gary can be first in something positive."

Brown also serves on the National Conference of State Legislatures health committee and is a member of the Indiana Black Legislative Caucus.

== Personal life ==
Brown's wife is Angela Baker Brown. They have one child. Brown lives in Gary, Indiana.
