= 1967 Gary, Indiana, mayoral election =

- November 7, 1967
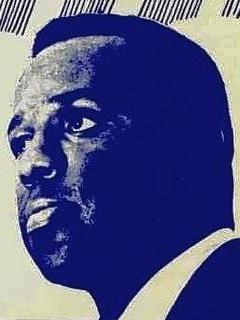

Nominee	Richard G. Hatcher	Joseph B. Radigan
Party	Democratic	Republican
Popular vote	39,940	37,729
Percentage	51.42%	48.58%
Mayor before election
A. Martin Katz
Democratic
Elected mayor
Richard G. Hatcher
Democratic

The 1967 Gary, Indiana, mayoral election, held on November 7, saw the election of Richard G. Hatcher.

This was, along with the coinciding election in Cleveland, Ohio, the first election of an African American as mayor of an American city with a population over 100,000. Hatcher would also become the first African-American mayor in the state of Indiana.

== Nominations ==
Primaries were held on May 2.

=== Democratic primary ===
Hatcher unseated incumbent mayor A. Martin Katz in the Democratic Party primary.

1967 Gary mayoral Democratic primary
Party	Candidate	Votes	%
Democratic	Richard G. Hatcher	18,227	39.26%
Democratic	A. Martin Katz (incumbent)	16,107	34.69%
Democratic	Bernard Konrady	12,092	26.05%
Turnout		46,426	

== General election ==
Usually, in the heavily-Democratic city, winning the Democratic nomination was tantamount to election. However the race was much closer in 1967 due to intense racial politics and the local Democratic political machine's anger over a non-machine reformer such as Hatcher having won the nomination. Although Republicans had given up on seriously contesting elections in Gary in the 1940s, it was believed that white voters in Gary had shown a willingness to abandon the Democratic Party if they believed that Democratic politicians were too accommodating to black voters when George Wallace performed well there in the 1964 Democratic presidential primary (in which the segregationist Wallace had challenged incumbent Democratic president Lyndon B. Johnson after Johnson ushered the passage of the Civil Rights Act of 1964); hence, with Richard Hatcher as the Democratic nominee for mayor, the general election was bitterly fought between Hatcher and the Republican nominee Joseph B. Radigan.

Due to the intense racial divide and the desire of white ethnic Democrats to maintain their grip on power over the city's Democratic machine and patronage system, prominent Democrats in the county machine (including the chairman of the Lake County Democratic Party) endorsed Republican Joe Radigan and worked to purge black voters from voter registration rolls and replace them with non-existent white voters, smashed voting machines in black-majority precincts, and employing white police officers to intimidate black voters from entering voting stations.

While Black Americans made up 53% of Gary's population, white residents had an edge in voter registration. Hatcher was able to overcome this and win the election by over 2,000 votes by winning 96% of the black vote in addition to 12% of the white vote.

1967 Gary mayoral election (general election)
Party	Candidate	Votes	%
Democratic	Richard G. Hatcher	39,940	51.42%
Republican	Joseph B. Radigan	37,729	48.58%
Turnout		77,669	100.00%
