= Ragen Hatcher =

American politician from Indiana

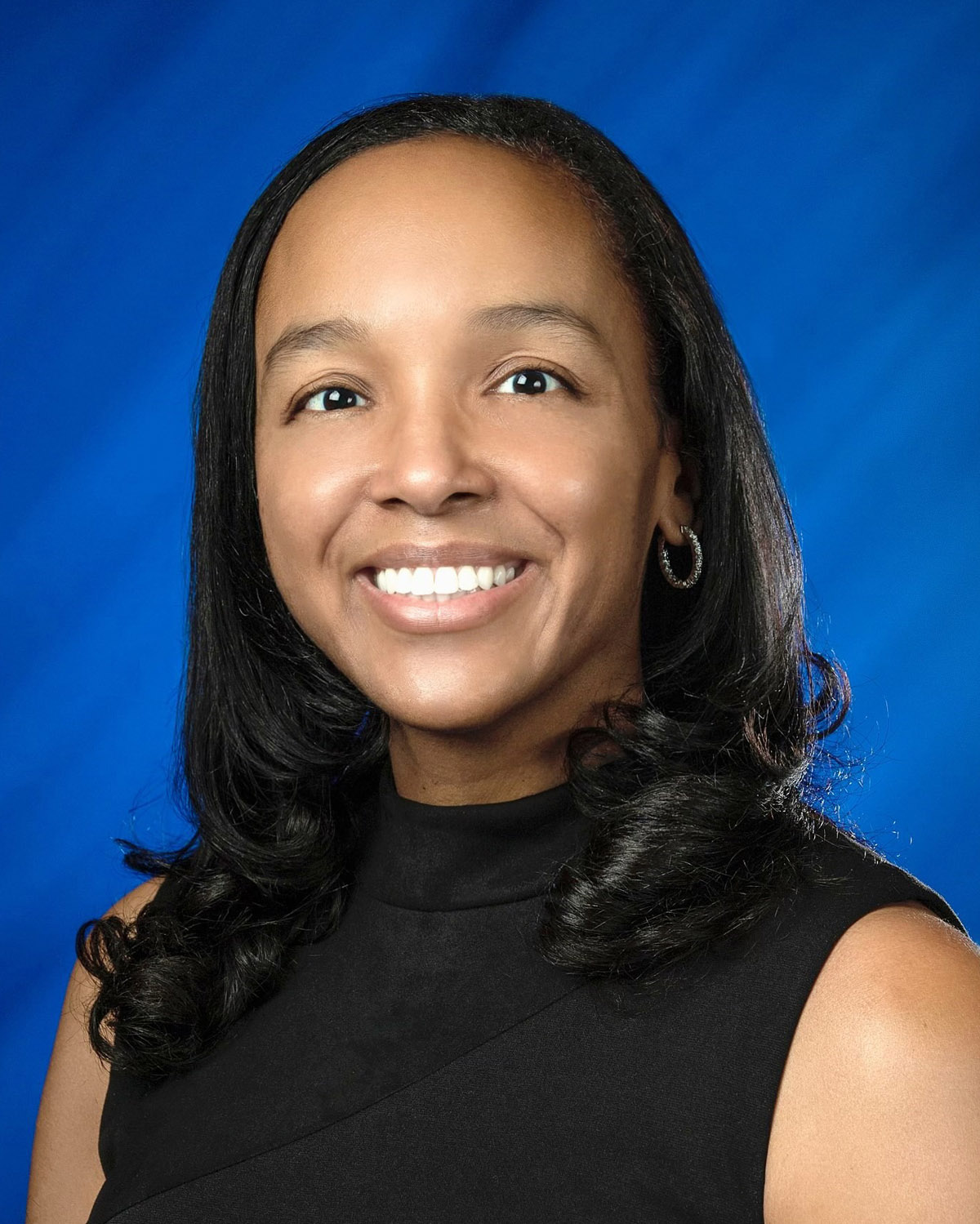
- Hatcher in 2022

Member of the Indiana House of Representatives from the 3rd district
- Incumbent
- Assumed office 2019
- Preceded by: Charlie Brown

Personal details
- Born: July 5, 1978 (age 48)
- Party: Democratic
- Parent(s): Richard G. Hatcher (father); Ruthellyn Marie Rowles Hatcher (mother)

Ragen Hatcher (born July 5, 1978) is an American politician from Gary, Indiana. A member of the Democratic Party, she serves in the Indiana House of Representatives.

Hatcher is the daughter of Richard G. Hatcher, a former mayor of Gary. She served on Gary's city council from 2007 through 2011. Hatcher ran for mayor of Gary in 2011, but lost the election. She was elected to the city council for another term in 2015. She ran for the third district in the Indiana House of Representatives in the 2018 elections to succeed Charlie Brown, and won. Hatcher briefly considered running for the Indiana Senate to succeed Eddie Melton in the 2020 elections. Melton decided to run for re-election to his Senate seat and Hatcher then decided to run for her State Rep seat.
