= 1965 Cleveland mayoral election =

- November 2, 1965

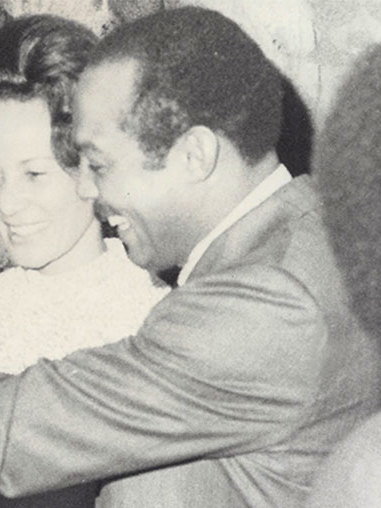

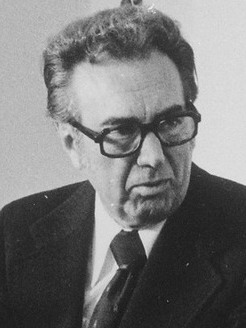

Nominee	Ralph S. Locher	Carl Stokes	Ralph Perk
Party	Democratic	Independent	Republican
Popular vote	87,858	87,716	41,045
Percentage	36.72%	36.66%	17.15%
Nominee	Ralph A. McAllister
Party	Independent
Popular vote	22,650
Percentage	9.47%
Mayor before election
Ralph S. Locher
Democratic
Elected mayor
Ralph S. Locher
Democratic

The Cleveland mayoral election of 1965 saw the reelection of Ralph S. Locher by an extremely narrow margin.

== General election ==
1965 Cleveland mayoral election (general election)
Party	Candidate	Votes	%
Democratic	Ralph S. Locher (incumbent)	87,858	36.72%
Independent	Carl Stokes	87,716	36.66%
Republican	Ralph Perk	41,045	17.15%
Independent	Ralph A. McAllister	22,650	9.47%
Turnout		239,269	
