= Statue of Richard G. Hatcher =

Public sculpture in Gary, Indiana, US

- Year: 2019
- Subject: Richard G. Hatcher
- Location: Gary, Indiana, U.S.; 41°36′12″N 87°20′11.7″W

A statue of Richard G. Hatcher was installed outside Gary City Hall, in Gary, Indiana, in 2019. Artist Gary Tillery sculpted the statue.
