= 1975 Cleveland mayoral election =

- November 4, 1975
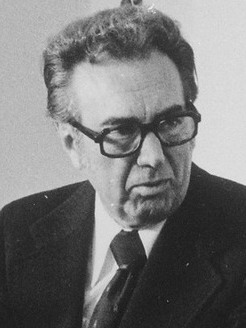

Candidate	Ralph Perk	Arnold R. Pinkney
Party	Nonpartisan	Nonpartisan
Popular vote	98,341	83,155
Percentage	54.18%	45.82%
Mayor before election
Ralph Perk
Republican
Elected mayor
Ralph Perk
Republican

The 1975 Cleveland mayoral election took place on November 4, 1975, to elect the Mayor of Cleveland, Ohio. Ralph Perk was reelected to a second consecutive term. The election was officially nonpartisan, with the top two candidates from the September 30 primary advancing to the general election.

== Primary election ==
Primary election results
Candidate	Votes	%
Arnold R. Pinkney	48,168	41.45%
Ralph Perk (incumbent)	44,130	37.97%
Patrick Sweeney	10,674	9.19%
Jim Dickerson	8,873	7.64%
Joseph Pirincin	1,721	1.48%
Richard B. Kay	1,241	1.07%
Anthony R. Curry	820	0.71%
Robert J. Bresnahan	590	0.51%
Total votes	116,217	

== General election ==
Cleveland mayoral election, 1975
Candidate	Votes	%
Ralph Perk (incumbent)	98,341	54.18%
Arnold R. Pinkney	83,155	45.82%
Total votes	181,496	
