= Richard G. Hatcher =

American politician and attorney (1933–2019)

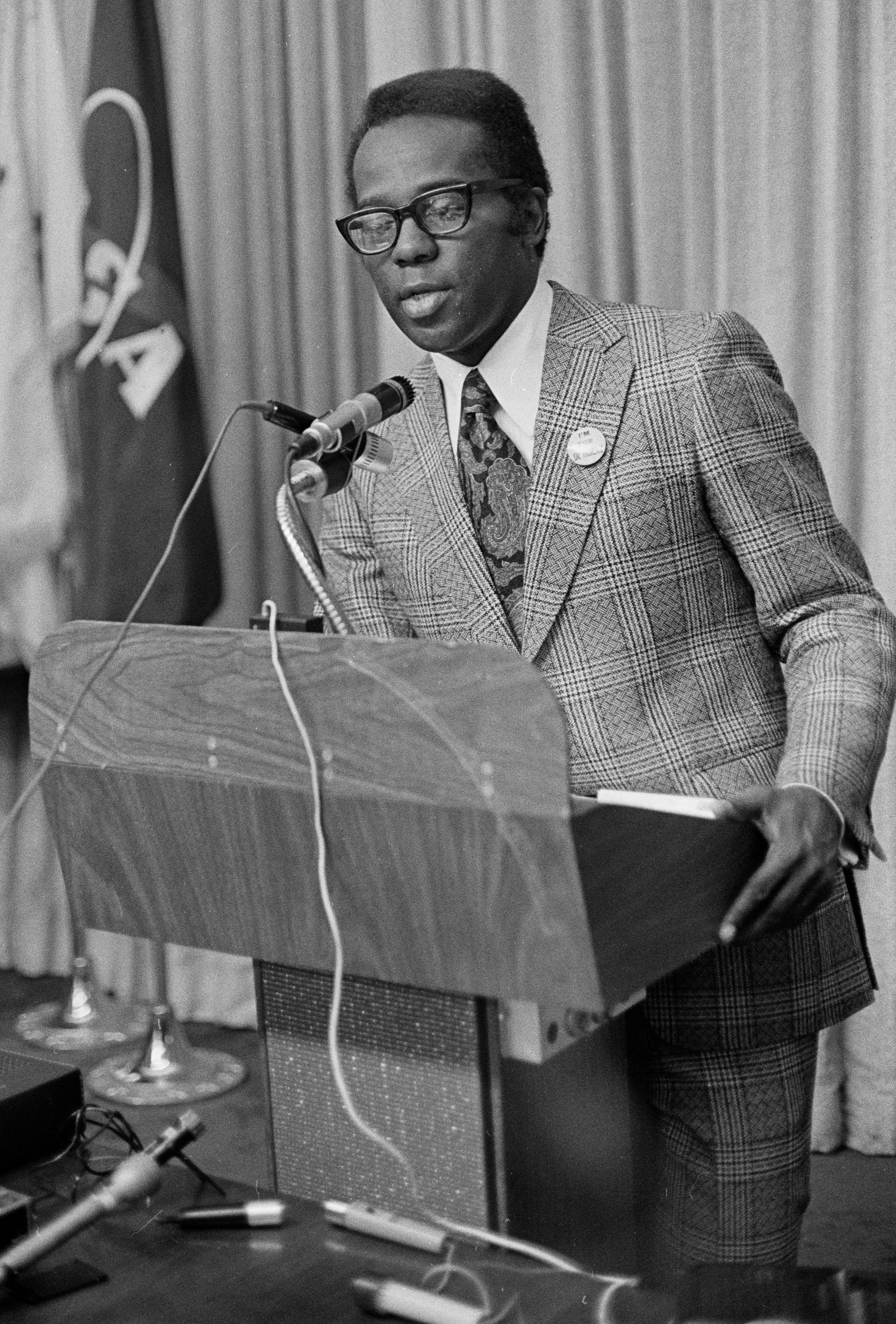
- Hatcher in 1972

16th Mayor of Gary, Indiana
- In office January 1, 1968 – January 1, 1988
- Preceded by: A. Martin Katz
- Succeeded by: Thomas V. Barnes

38th President of the United States Conference of Mayors
- In office 1980–1981
- Preceded by: Richard Carver
- Succeeded by: Helen Boosalis

Personal details
- Born: Richard Gordon Hatcher; July 10, 1933 Michigan City, Indiana, U.S.
- Died: December 13, 2019 (aged 86) Chicago, Illinois, U.S.
- Party: Democratic
- Children: Ragen Hatcher (daughter), Rachelle Hatcher (daughter), Renee Hatcher (daughter)
- Education: Indiana University (BS); Valparaiso University (LLB, JD)

Richard Gordon Hatcher (July 10, 1933 – December 13, 2019) was an American attorney and politician who served as the first African-American mayor of Gary, Indiana, for 20 years, from 1968 to 1988. At the time of his first election on November 7, 1967, he and Carl Stokes were the first African Americans to be elected mayors of a U.S. city with more than 100,000 people. Hatcher also served as vice-chairman of the Democratic National Committee in the early 1980s.

== Early life and education ==
Hatcher was born in Michigan City, Indiana. He received a Bachelor of Science degree in business and government from Indiana University and a Bachelor of Laws with honors in criminal law in 1956 and a Juris Doctor from Valparaiso University School of Law in 1959.

== Career ==
After moving to Gary, Indiana, Hatcher began practicing law in East Chicago, Indiana. In 1961, he began serving as a deputy prosecutor for Lake County, Indiana, until he was elected to Gary's City Council in 1963. He was the first and only freshman elected president of the City Council in Gary's history.

=== Mayor of Gary, Indiana ===
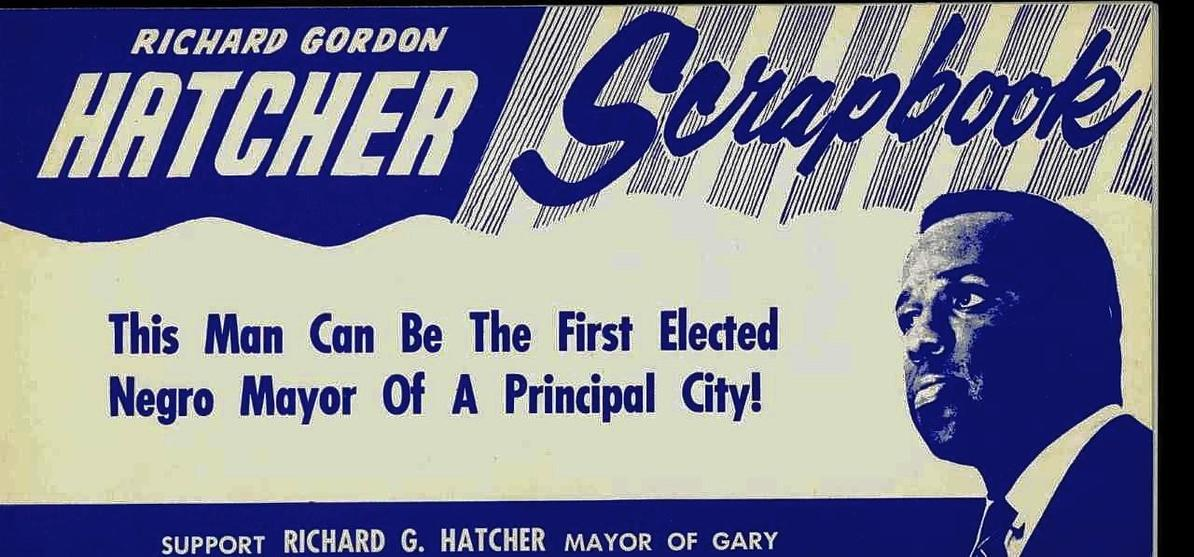
Campaign paraphernalia, 1967

Hatcher launched a primary challenge against incumbent mayor A. Martin Katz in the Democratic primary election, and won by just 2,300 votes. The Lake County Democratic Party's central organization, led by Chairman John Krupa, demanded that Hatcher allow them to select the city's police chief and city attorney, among other important city administrative offices, in exchange for their support for the general election. When Hatcher refused, Krupa directed the machine to work in favor of the Republican nominee, Joseph Radigan. In an intensely fought election marked by corruption, racial violence, voter purges and intimidation, and blatant vote rigging, Hatcher was able to cobble together a coalition of black voters and liberal white voters to overcome the odds and win the November election by just 2,200 votes.

Elected in 1967, Hatcher was inaugurated mayor of Gary in 1968 and served until 1987. During his tenure as mayor, he became internationally known as a fervent and prolific civil rights spokesman. Hatcher was known for developing innovative approaches to urban problems and for being a national and international spokesman for civil rights, minorities, the poor and America's cities. He often delivered speeches alongside Martin Luther King Jr., Robert F. Kennedy, Jesse Jackson, and other historic proponents of the civil rights movement. On April 5, 1968, he addressed President Lyndon B. Johnson, along with a collection of politicians and civil rights leaders, on the topic of the King assassination the night before and pending civil unrest.

Hatcher's tenure in office was difficult from the start. Although 4 of the 9 city council members were also black, two of these members appeared more loyal to the Democratic machine than to Hatcher. Three of the remaining five white city council members were consistently hostile to Hatcher and his proposals. The reasons for an uncooperative city council ranged from racial animosity to corruption over the patronage system and organized crime, to the personal political ambitions of some council members. However, Hatcher was successful in eliminating a red light district and reducing illegal gambling nearly to zero. However, as the city's steel industry began to collapse as part of the steel crisis of the 1970s and 1980s, unemployment and crime began to rise, and white flight and population decline began to intensify. Governing became easier after 1971, when a number of allies were elected to the city council and took positions in city administration. Hatcher's good government initiatives did help clean up the police department of corruption and reduced patronage, but macroeconomic and societal forces beyond the city's control caused Gary to spiral into severe decline.

In his first term, Hatcher expanded the city's police force by 40%.

Although Hatcher won the 1967 election, the white-dominated Democratic machine was not about to give up; instead, they changed tactics and supported a middle-class black primary challenger who they felt was a racial moderate and (most importantly) was more cooperative with the machine: Dr. Alexander Williams, a prominent black physician who was elected Lake County coroner with the machine's backing, and who represented Gary's black middle class and criticized Hatcher's tactics and policies. Specifically, Williams criticized the ongoing crime wave and Hatcher's urban renewal policies that saw the demolition of thousands of housing units while only 300 replacement units were built. However, Williams won only 37.5% of the vote in the primary, as black voters remained overwhelmingly loyal to Hatcher. Hatcher then went on to crush the Republican nominee in the November general election by more than 50,000 votes, marking the end to any serious challenges from the Republicans or the Democratic machine.

In 1971, Hatcher targeted the neighboring unincorporated area of Merrillville, Indiana, for annexation to gain more land for suburban expansion and to recapture some of the population that had left Gary. However, the white suburban state representatives passed a special exemption to Indiana's incorporation laws (which prohibited incorporation within a five-mile radius of an incorporated city) which allowed Merrillville to incorporate itself into a town. Following this, virtually all major retailers, banks, and other business establishments closed their location and fled to Merrillville. Over 100 major businesses moved from downtown Gary and Broadway Avenue to Merrillville in the 1970s, making downtown Gary into a ghost town. Tens of thousands of white residents followed, and Gary lost valuable jobs, residents, and tax revenues.

Hatcher was instrumental in getting the 1972 National Black Political Convention to come to Gary when the convention organizers struggled to find a city willing to host the event.

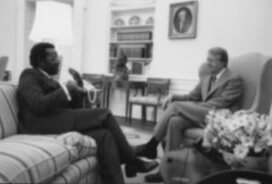
Hatcher in the Oval Office with President Jimmy Carter in 1978

After Democratic presidential nomination candidate Jimmy Carter in 1976 expressed sympathy with whites wishing to preserve the "ethnic purity" of their neighborhoods, a comment which was roundly condemned by other Democrats and resulted in a public apology, Mayor Hatcher characterized Carter as a "Frankenstein monster with a Southern drawl."

From 1980 until 1981, Hatcher served as president of the United States Conference of Mayors.

In the 1984 U.S. presidential election, Mayor Hatcher served as the chairman for Jackson's campaign. He served as one of five Vice-Chairs of the Democratic National Committee from 1981 to 1985.

Projects Hatcher pursued in hopes of reversing the city's economic decline included an expansion of the city's airport to handle commercial traffic, the construction of the Genesis Convention Center, and the construction and opening of a Holiday Inn hotel in 1971. Over the course of his tenure, Hatcher was able to secure hundreds of million of dollars from the federal government for subsidized housing and job-training programs. Despite Hatcher's efforts to stymie the city's decline, which was driven largely by a decrease in steel production jobs, the city continued to lose population during his mayoralty and face economic plight. When Hatcher assumed office, Gary had a roughly 15% poverty rate. When he left office in 1987, the city had a 25% poverty rate and an unemployment in excess of 20%. Hatcher and his supporters have argued that racism played a role in the rate of disinvestment from the city.

=== Later life ===
In 1988, Hatcher started his own consulting firm, R. Gordon Hatcher & Associates. From 1988 to 1989, he worked as an Institute of Politics Fellow at Harvard Kennedy School. He also began teaching political science at Roosevelt University in 1989 and later became a senior research professor at Valparaiso University, in 1991. In the summer of 1996, Hatcher taught a law course at Cambridge University in England. In 1991, he sought to retake his former position as mayor, unsuccessfully challenging incumbent Thomas Barnes in the Democratic primary. He later served as an adjunct professor at Indiana University Northwest.

== Personal life ==
His daughter, Ragen Hatcher, is a member of the Indiana House of Representatives.

Hatcher died at Mercy Hospital and Medical Center in Chicago on December 13, 2019. He was 86 years old. Hatcher's funeral was held on December 21, 2019.

== See also ==
- Statue of Richard G. Hatcher
- List of first African-American mayors
