= June Cotner =

American writer (born 1950)

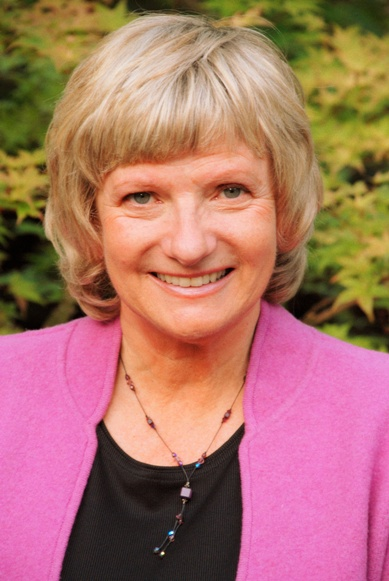
- Cotner in 2009
- Born: February 6, 1950 (age 76); Chicago, Illinois, U.S.
- Education: University of California, Berkeley
- Occupations: Author, anthologist, speaker, publishing consultant
- Writing career
- Notable works: Prayers: Prayers, Poems, and Prose for Everyday Thankfulness
- Website: www.junecotner.com

June Cotner (born February 6, 1950, in Chicago, Illinois) is an American author, anthologist, speaker, and publishing/marketing consultant; her latest anthology is Gratitude Prayers: Prayers, Poems, and Prose for Everyday Thankfulness (Andrews McMeel Publishing).

== Early life and education ==
Cotner was born on February 6, 1950, in Chicago, Illinois. She later attended the University of California, Berkeley, where she completed her undergraduate studies.

== Career ==
Cotner's collected works have sold nearly one million copies. Cotner conducts publishing workshops at bookstores across the country and has also made presentations at the Pacific Northwest Writers' Association Conference, the Pacific Northwest Booksellers Association Conference, and The Learning Annex in New York City, San Francisco, Los Angeles, and San Diego.

== Books ==
Cotner writes collections of short prayers and poems. Her first book, Graces: Prayers and Poems for Everyday Meals and Other Occasions (1994), went into sixteen printings and sold over 100,000 copies. Her next book, Bedside Prayers: Prayers and Poems for When You Rise and Go to Sleep (1997), was also successful. By 1998, she was preparing two more books: Blessings of the Heart: Prayers and Poems for Everyday Life and Special Occasions and Prayers of the Universe, a collection of prayers with a global focus.

In 1998, Cotner published Bless the Day: Prayers & Poems to Nurture Your Soul, a collection of poems and prayers on themes such as hope, courage, love, and faith. That same year, she also published Heal Your Soul, Heal the World: Prayers and Poems to Comfort, Inspire, and Connect Humanity, an anthology of inspirational writings, poems, and prayers from contributors around the world. Cotner published Family Celebrations: Prayers, Poems, and Toasts for Every Occasion in 1999, a collection of 170 prayers, poems, and toasts intended for use at birthdays, weddings, anniversaries, and other family occasions.

In 2000, Cotner released Animal Blessings: Prayers and Poems Celebrating Our Pets, an anthology of poems and prayers about the relationships people form with their animals. Cotner compiled Mothers and Daughters: A Poetry Celebration in 2001, arranging more than 100 poems about the mother–daughter relationship. In 2002, Cotner published two anthologies: Teen Sunshine Reflections: Words for the Heart and Soul, a collection for young adult fiction readers, and Christmas Blessings: Prayers and Poems to Celebrate the Season, a compilation of classic and contemporary Christmas poems and prayers. Cotner also published Baby Blessings: Inspiring Poems and Prayers for Every Stage of Babyhood in the same year, a collection of poems, lullabies, and blessings covering pregnancy and the toddler years.

In 2003, Cotner published Wedding Blessings: Prayers and Poems Celebrating Love, Marriage and Anniversaries, a multi-faith collection of poems, prayers, vows, and toasts for weddings and anniversaries. A year later, in 2004, Cotner compiled Comfort Prayers: Prayers and Poems to Comfort, Encourage, and Inspire, a collection of prayers, poems, and prose selected from "more than 4,000 submissions" and "more than 1,000 inspirational books". Cotner followed this work with Wishing You Well: Prayers and Poems for Comfort, Healing, and Recovery in 2005, a collection of prayers, poems, and blessings offering encouragement to readers facing difficult times. That same year, Cotner released House Blessings: Prayers, Poems, and Toasts Celebrating Home and Family, a collection of interfaith prayers, poems, and toasts featuring 112 pieces from 38 writers and celebrating the moments that make a house a home.

In 2006, Cotner published Forever in Love: A Celebration of Love and Romance, a collection of poems and prose that follows love's journey from its earliest moments to more reflective works influenced by writers such as Rumi. Cotner published Dog Blessings: Poems, Prose, and Prayers Celebrating Our Relationship with Dogs in 2008, a collection of poems and prayers about the roles dogs play in human life. After releasing Dog Blessings in 2008, Cotner released Serenity Prayers: Prayers, Poems, and Prose to Soothe Your Soul in 2009, a collection drawing on works by writers such as Walt Whitman and Henry David Thoreau. Say a Little Prayer: A Journal by June Cotner was released in 2011, a guided journal offering practical tips, selected prayers and quotes, and space for personal reflection.

In 2013, Cotner released Gratitude Prayers: Prayers, Poems, and Prose for Everyday Thankfulness, a collection of more than 100 prayers, poems, and quotes featuring writers such as Anne Frank and Helen Keller. In 2014, Cotner published Back to Joy: Little Reminders to Help Us Through Tough Times, a collection of inspirational quotes, poems, and short prose featuring writers such as Confucius, Pablo Picasso, Ralph Waldo Emerson, A. A. Milne, and Eleanor Roosevelt. In the same year, Cotner published Soar!: Follow Your Dreams, a gift book for students and graduates that pairs motivational quotes with short original prose on choices, perseverance, inspiration, and success. Cotner also released Sticky Note Journal: A Place for All My Ideas in 2015, a 96‑page journal kit featuring decorative sticky‑note pads in multiple sizes designed for notes, reminders, and everyday use.

In 2016, Cotner co‑authored We Are Women: Celebrating Our Wit and Grit with Barb Mayer, a collection featuring early‑20th‑century photographs of women alongside selected quotations. In 2021, Cotner published Hey! It’s Your Day: Inspirational Quotes and Affirmations to Live By, a 208‑page collection of quotations. Cotner and Nancy Tupper Ling followed with Bless the Earth: A Collection of Poetry for Children to Celebrate and Care for Our World in 2024, an illustrated poetry book for young readers.

== Awards ==
- In 2023, For Every Little Thing: Poems and Prayers to Celebrate the Day, an anthology co‑selected by Nancy Tupper Ling and June Cotner, won the Mindfulness Category at the Northern Lights Book Awards.
- Bless the Earth: A Collection of Poetry for Children to Celebrate and Care for Our World is an illustrated anthology edited by June Cotner and Nancy Tupper Ling that won the Poetry Category at the 2024 Northern Lights Book Awards.

== Personal life ==
Cotner and her husband live in Poulsbo, Washington, and have two adult children. She also has two grandchildren, and her interests include yoga and hiking.
