= 1969 Cleveland mayoral election =

- November 4, 1969
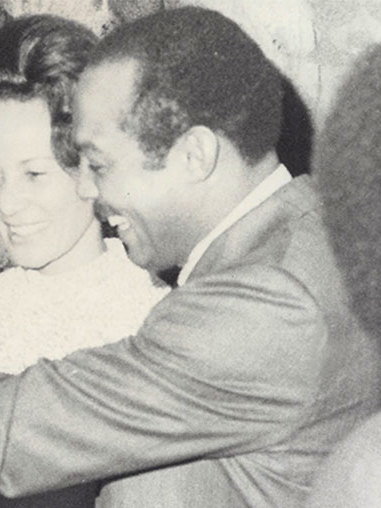

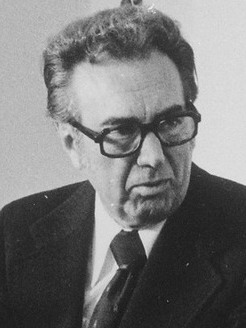
Nominee	Carl Stokes	Ralph Perk
Party	Democratic	Republican
Popular vote	120,559	116,806
Percentage	50.48%	48.91%
Mayor before election
Carl Stokes
Democratic
Elected mayor
Carl Stokes
Democratic

The Cleveland mayoral election of 1969 saw the reelection of Carl Stokes.

== General election ==
1969 Cleveland mayoral election (general election)
Party	Candidate	Votes	%
Democratic	Carl Stokes (incumbent)	120,559	50.48%
Republican	Ralph Perk	116,806	48.91%
Independent	Sydney Stapleton	1,478	0.62%
Turnout		238,843	
