= Carl Stokes =

American politician

United States Ambassador to Seychelles
- In office September 7, 1994 – May 12, 1995
- President: Bill Clinton
- Preceded by: F. Stephen Malott
- Succeeded by: Brent E. Blaschke

51st Mayor of Cleveland
- In office November 13, 1967 – November 8, 1971
- Preceded by: Ralph S. Locher
- Succeeded by: Ralph Perk

Personal details
- Born: Carl Burton Stokes; June 21, 1927 Cleveland, Ohio, U.S.
- Died: April 3, 1996 (aged 68) Cleveland, Ohio, U.S.
- Cause of death: Cancer
- Resting place: Lake View Cemetery, Cleveland, Ohio, U.S.
- Party: Democratic
- Spouses: Shirley Edwards (m. 1958; div. 1973); Raija Kostadinov (m. 1981; div. 1993) (m. 1996)
- Children: 5
- Parent(s): Charles Stokes; Louise Stone
- Relatives: Louis Stokes (Brother)
- Education: University of Minnesota; Cleveland–Marshall College of Law
- Occupation: Politician; Attorney

Military service
- Allegiance: United States
- Branch/service: United States Army
- Years of service: 1945–1946
- Rank: Private
- Battles/wars: World War II
- Awards: World War II Victory Medal

Carl Burton Stokes (June 21, 1927 – April 3, 1996) was an American politician and diplomat of the Democratic Party who served as the 51st mayor of Cleveland, Ohio. Elected on November 7, 1967, and taking office on January 1, 1968, he was one of the first black elected mayors of a major U.S. city. (Note: Although Stokes was elected after Richard G. Hatcher of Gary, Indiana, Stokes took office first. Walter Washington was first black mayor of a major city (Washington, DC), but was appointed. Fellow Ohioan Robert C. Henry had been appointed mayor of Springfield, Ohio a year earlier, in 1966. Other African Americans had served as mayors of smaller communities during and after Reconstruction.)

== Early life ==
Stokes was born in Cleveland's Central neighborhood, the son of Louise (Stone) and Charles Stokes, a laundryman who died when Carl was around two or three years old. He and his brother, politician Louis Stokes, were raised by their mother at the CMHA's Outhwaite Homes. Stokes was a strong student, but in 1944, he dropped out of high school and took up work at Thompson Products (later TRW). At 18, he joined the U.S. Army and returned to Cleveland after his discharge in 1946. After earning his diploma at East Technical High School the following year, Stokes, who was inspired by civil rights activist Paul Robeson, decided to pursue a career in public service. After attending several colleges, he earned his bachelor's degree in 1954 from the University of Minnesota. In 1956, he graduated from Cleveland-Marshall College of Law and in 1957, was admitted to the Ohio State Bar Association. While studying law, he served as a probation officer. He served as assistant prosecutor for four years, eventually becoming a partner in the law firm of Stokes, Stokes, continuing that practice into his political career; it was successful after one year.

== Career ==
Stokes served in the Ohio House of Representatives. He narrowly lost a bid for mayor of Cleveland in 1965. His victory two years later drew national attention, as he was the first black mayor of one of the ten biggest cities in the United States.

A charismatic political figure, Stokes had the ability to mobilize both black and white voters. With a 50.5% margin, he defeated Seth Taft, the grandson of former President William Howard Taft in 1967. At the time of his election, Cleveland was a majority white city with a 37% black population. A crucial part of his support came from local businessmen. Stokes won 95% of the Black vote and won by only 1600 votes according to CBS. After his election, Stokes said, "I can find no more fitting way to end this appeal, by saying to all of you, in a more serious and in the most meaningful way that I can, that truly never before have I ever known to the extent that I know tonight, the full meaning of the words, 'God Bless America', thanks a lot."

As mayor, Stokes "opened city hall jobs to blacks and women." He was known as a strong administrator and reformer, and is remembered for his vision and motivation. Stokes feuded with City Council and the Police Department for much of his tenure. He also initiated Cleveland: Now!, a public and private funding program aimed at the revitalization of Cleveland neighborhoods. Despite fallout over the Glenville shootout, Stokes pulled through and was reelected in 1969. As mayor, he also played a pivotal role in the effort to restore Cleveland's Cuyahoga River in the aftermath of the river fire of June 1969 that brought national attention to the issue of industrial pollution in Cleveland.

Stokes received the "NNPA Award," highest honor of the National Newspaper Publishers Association in 1971.

After his mayoral administration, Stokes gave lectures to colleges around the country. In 1972, he became the first black anchorman in New York City after securing a job with WNBC-TV. While at WNBC New York, Stokes won a New York State Regional Emmy for excellence in craft, for a piece about the opening of the Paul Robeson play, starring James Earl Jones on Broadway. In 1979, he briefly visited Cleveland to endorse Mayor Dennis Kucinich in the 1979 Cleveland mayoral election, warning that "if Voinovich wins, the Democrats might as well forget about the state of Ohio in 1980." After accusing NBC of failing to promote him to a national brief, he returned to Cleveland in 1980 and took up a stint with United Auto Workers, serving as general legal counsel.

Stokes became a municipal judge in Cleveland in 1983. Subsequently, President Bill Clinton appointed him U.S. Ambassador to the Republic of Seychelles in 1994. Stokes received several civic awards, 12 honorary degrees, and served as a U.S. representative "on numerous goodwill trips abroad by request of the White House." He was elected the first black president of the National League of Cities in 1970.

Stokes was diagnosed with cancer of the esophagus while serving as Ambassador to the Seychelles and placed on medical leave. He returned to Cleveland and died at the Cleveland Clinic. His funeral was held at Cleveland Music Hall, presided over by the Rev. Otis Moss. The funeral was carried on WERE radio. Stokes was buried at Lake View Cemetery in Cleveland.

== Legacy ==
The US Federal Courthouse Tower in downtown Cleveland, completed in 2002, was named the Carl B. Stokes Federal Court House Building. There are many other buildings, monuments and a street named for his memory within the City of Cleveland including the CMHA Carl Stokes Center, Stokes Boulevard, and the eponymous Carl Stokes Brigade club. Members of the Brigade celebrate his birthday every year at Lakeview Cemetery with gravesite services.

In November 2006, the Western Reserve Historical Society opened an exhibit entitled Carl and Louis Stokes: from Projects to Politics. Focusing on the brothers' early life at the Outhwaite projects, service in World War II, and eventual rise to politics, the exhibit ran until September 2008.

Perhaps Stokes' greatest legacy was his work to save and preserve Cleveland's Cuyahoga River. Of his efforts, the National Park Service wrote:

Stokes was ahead of his time. By the 1980s, the environmental justice movement helped broaden environmentalism. It focuses on how poor environmental conditions affect low-income and minority communities more than others. Part of Stokes' legacy is a reminder to think about how we address issues to benefit us all.

Dissatisfied with the account of his life presented on his headstone, a small group of activists took founded The Carl Burton Stokes History & Legacy Project.

== Notes ==
Political offices
Preceded by Ralph S. Locher	Mayor of Cleveland; 1968–1971	Succeeded by Ralph J. Perk
Diplomatic posts
Preceded by F. Stephen Malott	United States Ambassador to Seychelles; 1994–1995	Succeeded by Brent E. Blaschke (Chargé d'affaires)
