= Seth Taft =

American politician (1922–2013)

Member of the Cuyahoga County Commission from Seat 3
- In office 1971 – 1978
- Succeeded by: Edward F. Feighan

Personal details
- Born: Seth Chase Taft; December 31, 1922
- Died: April 14, 2013 (aged 90) Pepper Pike, Ohio, U.S.
- Political party: Republican
- Spouse: Frances Martha Prindle (m. 1943–2013; his death)
- Children: 4
- Parent(s): Charles Phelps Taft II; Eleanor Chase Taft
- Occupation: Lawyer, politician

Seth Chase Taft (December 31, 1922 – April 14, 2013) was an American lawyer and politician of the Republican party, and a grandson of President William Howard Taft.

== Early life and education ==
Seth Chase Taft's paternal grandfather was President William Howard Taft. His parents were Cincinnati, Ohio mayor Charles Phelps Taft II and Eleanor Chase Taft, whose father ran the Waterbury Clock Company. Taft had five sisters and one brother and grew up in Cincinnati, Ohio. He married in 1943 to Frances Martha "Franny" Prindle from New Haven, Connecticut.

== Career ==
Taft was an unsuccessful candidate for the Ohio Senate in 1962. He ran for the office of the mayor of Cleveland, in 1967, losing to Democratic candidate Carl B. Stokes, the first African American mayor of a major city.

In 1982, Taft sought the Republican nomination for governor of Ohio, but he lost the primary race to Clarence J. "Bud" Brown Jr. He was, however, a Cuyahoga County, Ohio Commissioner. Seth and Franny Taft had three sons: Frederick I. Taft, Thomas P. Taft, and Seth T. Taft, and a daughter, Cynthia Taft.

Seth Taft served as Cuyahoga County Commissioner from 1971 to 1978.

He died on April 14, 2013, at his home in Pepper Pike, Ohio, after a fall at 90 years old. His wife died four years later, at 95. They were both buried at Lake View Cemetery in Cleveland. They are survived by 4 children, 10 grandchildren, and 12 great grandchildren.

== See also ==
- Taft family
