= Mercedes R. Cotner =

American politician

Mercedes R. Cotner (March 1905 - November 29, 1998) was an American politician, serving as a Cleveland City Council member and the first woman clerk. She was also the first Democratic woman to run for mayor of Cleveland.

== Early life ==
Her parents were Caroline E. (Auer) and John S. Trapp. Cotner grew up in Ohio City.

== Career ==
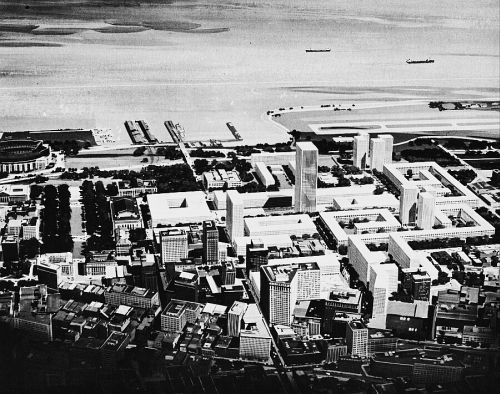
The original Erieview urban renewal plan.

Mercedes was a precinct committee member then ward leader. In 1954, she was appointed to Cleveland City Council, then won elections in Ward 2 until becoming clerk in 1964. She retired in 1989.

Cotner opposed an incinerator in her district. She supported the Erieview project and urban renewal.

In 1973, Cotner ran for mayor when James Carney dropped out 13 days before the election. In 1987, Cotner was appointed to RTA.

== Personal life ==
Cotner married George Cotner in 1927. She had two children, Gerald L. and Timothy G.
