= University Circle Properties Development =

University Circle Properties Development, Inc.
- Founded: 1968
- Founder: Winston E. Willis
- Headquarters: Cleveland Ohio

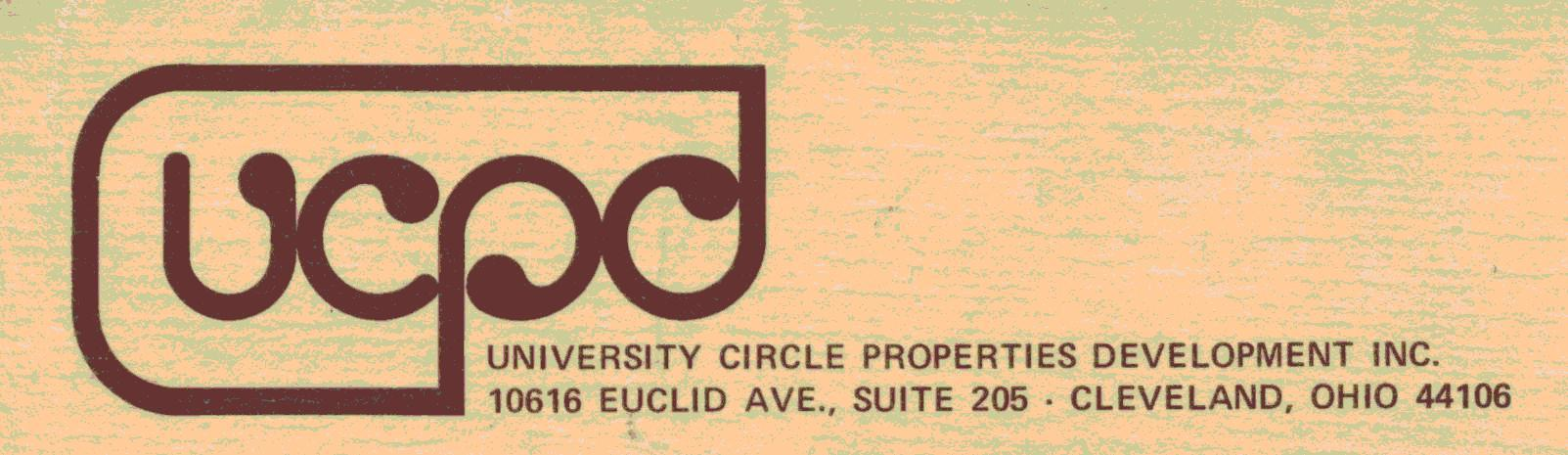
UCPD Inc. Company Logo

University Circle Properties Development, Inc. (UCPD, Inc.) was a commercial property development corporation established in 1968 in Cleveland Ohio. Located in the University Circle area at the famous intersection of Euclid Avenue and East 105th Street, the area came to be known colloquially during the 1960s and 1970s as "105 and Euclid" and "The Block". Founded by a young African-American businessman, Winston E. Willis, UCPD, Inc. was the umbrella organization for a number of thriving businesses on the lower East side. After operating successfully for over fifteen years, and following decades of courtroom confrontations and legal battles over property rights, UCPD, Inc. and all of its popular 105th and Euclid businesses were demolished in 1982 to make way for the continuing expansion of the Cleveland Clinic Foundation and numerous government sponsored redevelopment projects.

== History ==
The Euclid Avenue and East 105th Street intersection, originally known as Doan's Corners, was the site of the old Keith's East 105th St. Theater, where comedian Bob Hope got his start in Vaudeville. University Circle Properties Development, Inc. was founded in 1968 by a local young African-American entrepreneur, Winston E. Willis. His purchase of the property followed a long and contentious legal struggle with the former titleholder, the Cleveland Trust Company, and other Cuyahoga County officials. Questions were raised by University Circle Incorporated (UCI), the Cleveland Clinic, and others as to his qualifications to own and redevelop “blighted” property. During the turbulent riot-torn 1960s, local events (e.g., the Reverend Bruce W. Klunder bulldozer murder, the Hough Riots, and the Glenville Shootout) had begun to trigger white flight, and businesses on Euclid Avenue were being closed, boarded up and sometimes abandoned.

UCPD, Inc. was “…organized to plan and implement the redevelopment of Cleveland’s Euclid Avenue and 105th Street area after too many years of social indifference.”

Following his eventual acquisitions, UCPD, Inc. went on to develop and operate 23 small businesses at the site employing more than 400 workers (most of whom were people of color), at a time when very little prospect for economic advancement was open for local minorities in Cleveland's inner-city. The popular strip, often referred to as “an inner-city Disneyland”, was one of the most strategic and valuable real estate parcels in the city and flourished for 15 years.

The company's Euclid Avenue businesses included: •PlayLand Fascination Arcade •Performing Arts Theater •The Brave New World •UCPD, Inc. Offices •Scrumpy-Dump Cinema •New Orleans Restaurant •Boon Docks Seafood Restaurant •The Bedroom Lounge •Mr. John’s Haberdashery •The Record Den •Wig Wholesalers •Cold-Blooded Menswear •State Liquor Store •PayMaster Money Exchange •Bosa Nova Lounge •Winston’s Place Fine Dining •Quick-Pick Food & Beverage •Adult Book Store •Pussycat Cinex •Quarter Movie Arcade •WinJam Studios •Circus Maximus •UCPD Commissary.

The UCPD, Inc. businesses stood in the way of the city’s plans for creating a medical-educational complex connecting Case Western Reserve University, University Hospitals, and the Cleveland Clinic Foundation. Willis had faced legal troubles with the city, including violations of tax law. He was convicted on a bad check charge, and while he was imprisoned in 1982, the city seized his properties and demolished them, freeing the land for the large medical development.
