= Winston E. Willis =

American real estate developer

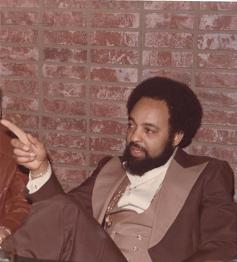
Winston E. Willis in 1981

Winston Earl Willis (born October 21, 1939) is an American former real estate developer who established his business in Cleveland, Ohio during the early 1960s. He created University Circle Properties Development, Inc. (UCPD, Inc.), which owned real estate parcels in Cleveland and was the largest employer of black people in that part of the country. Under UCPD at East 105th and Euclid, upwards of 23 businesses operated simultaneously. In the 1970s and 80s Willis ran afoul of tax and other laws and lost his properties to seizure in 1983. His ongoing legal battles with the city of Cleveland over ownership of his lands spans several decades, including his 2007 petition to the U.S. Supreme Court.

== Early life ==
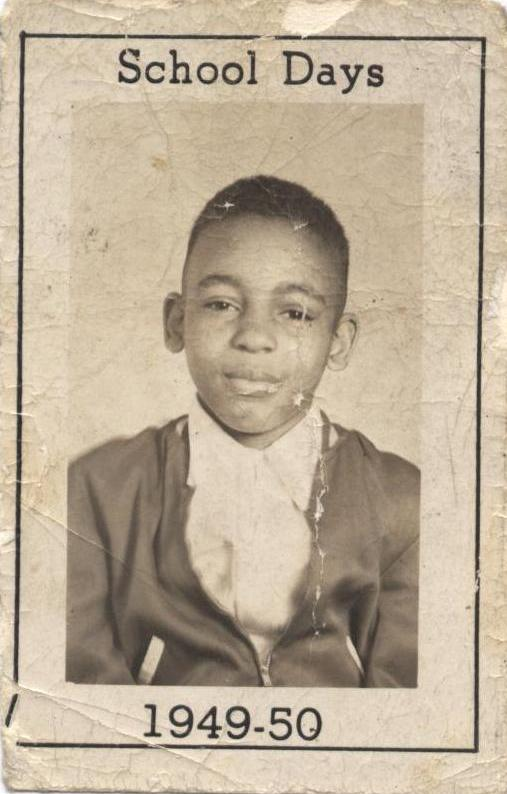
Winston, Age 9

Willis was born in Montgomery, Alabama, the third of the five children of Clarence C. Willis and his wife, Alberta Frazier Willis, both natives of Montgomery. The Willis children attended St. Jude Educational Institute at the 36-acre (150,000 m^{2}) City of St. Jude. In the fall of 1954, when Winston was 14, the Willis family settled in Detroit. Winston's father's years of experience as a carpet installer for the Montgomery Fair department store enabled him to find suitable employment and settle his family into a quiet neighborhood on the West side near Dearborn. There, Winston created, published and delivered his own neighborhood advertising newspaper, the Western Detroit Shopping News. His high school career at Chadsey High School was uneventful – and brief.

== First business ventures ==
He sold Collier's Encyclopedias door-to-door, a venture that resulted in his arrest for loitering in affluent white neighborhoods. His knowledge of the floor covering trade, which he learned at his father's side, led to his hiring by a Detroit retail tile store, where he advanced to manager. His plan was to head for Hollywood, where he intended to become the first successful black movie producer. Before setting out on that odyssey with a neighborhood friend, he took a brief trip to Cleveland in 1958 for a short visit with relatives at his mother's insistence. After arriving, Willis went on a four-day spree playing One-Pocket, a billiards game, and won several thousand dollars. He decided to stay a few weeks, playing more games to finance the planned trip to the West coast. He reconsidered that plan and decided to postpone the trip. The 19-year-old Willis leased a building that was previously an automobile showroom and opened The Jazz Temple, a liquor-free coffeehouse and night club, to immediate success.

Willis approached such legendary jazz artists as Miles Davis, John Coltrane, Dizzy Gillespie, Herbie Hancock, Cannonball Adderley, The Ramsey Lewis Trio, and Dinah Washington and convinced them to come to Cleveland to appear at his club. The trendy establishment also attracted visits from Malcolm X, and Stokely Carmichael and performances from other notables, such as comedians Redd Foxx, Bill Cosby, Richard Pryor and Dick Gregory. The night spot became popular with college students, and the clientele included interracial couples, which triggered resentment and threats from the racially polarized community. A bomb was planted in the club, and Willis closed the business a few weeks later. He launched another venture, the Hot Potato Restaurant, on Cleveland's lower East side. The small restaurant enabled him to finance his next business.

== Building an empire ==
Willis hoped to revitalize a large parcel of land encompassing the old Doan's Corner at East 105th Street and Euclid Avenue, site of the Keith's East 105th Theater where comedian Bob Hope got his start in vaudeville. The area had deteriorated following the Hough Riots of 1966 and the Glenville Shootout of 1968. Those events accelerated white flight from historically polarized Cleveland communities, affecting businesses on Euclid Avenue, which suffered rapidly dwindling patronage. After a long and contentious legal struggle with the former titleholder, The Cleveland Trust Company, Willis bought the property, which was flanked on either side by University Circle and the Cleveland Clinic.

Willis opened and operated numerous businesses on the Euclid Avenue strip. He established University Circle Properties Development, Inc. (UCPD, Inc.), a commercial property development corporation, to manage the stores and shops. The businesses included restaurants, movie theaters, clothing stores, taverns, a food market, a check cashing store, a penny arcade, a state liquor store, and an adult book store. At one time there were 28 businesses in operation, employing over 400 people. A 1973 Cleveland Press newspaper article heralded the strip in a cover story entitled: “Winston Willis’ Miracle on East 105th Street...”.

== Legal troubles ==
In 1975 Willis was convicted of failing to pay city income taxes. In 1979 a police raid found drugs and gambling equipment at Winston's Place. By 1980 he was found guilty of more tax violations and accused of owing thousands of dollars on water and sewer bills. Willis alleged that he was being harassed by the city and that his properties were targeted for excessive inspections by the fire department. The fire inspections gained the notoriety of a sporting event; they were unscheduled, unannounced and routinely happened at the height of business hours when the restaurants and movie theaters and other businesses were teeming with customers. Newspaper publisher W.O. Walker’s Call & Post ran an editorial sympathetic to Willis, "Fire Inspections as Weapons":

"It is unfortunate when city workers are forced to carry out their normal duties as a means of affecting the policy and prejudices of higher ranking officials….That does not excuse higher-ups from blame for fomenting a plot against Willis...."

== Fight with the city ==
The property Willis owned occupied an area the city wanted for a large medical-educational complex connecting Case Western Reserve University, University Hospitals, and the Cleveland Clinic Foundation. Willis fought the city with lawsuits, as reported in the local press, "Willis, who has made a battleground of the courts in his fight… is on the legal rampage again." Other headlines followed, such as "Willis Alleges Land Squeeze In Area Around E. 105 and Euclid". A July 13, 1977 front page Plain Dealer article reported: "Cleveland businessman, Winston E. Willis yesterday filed a $100 million dollar lawsuit charging that the Cleveland Clinic Foundation, University Circle Inc.,(UCI) and others are monopolizing real estate and violating antitrust laws. Willis, who owns a strip of shops and offices on Euclid Avenue between E. 105th and E. 107th Streets, said he and his tenants are being forced out of business." Numerous lawsuits Willis filed in the local Federal District Court and the Ohio Court of Common Pleas in defense of his holdings were dismissed.

== The billboards ==
In his battle with the city, Willis erected a large billboard on the side of his building overlooking Euclid Avenue, the main thoroughfare for suburban commuters to Cleveland's downtown financial center. He used the billboard to criticize what he believed was corruption and cronyism among Cuyahoga County officials, the local judiciary, and philanthropic institutions, and what he believed was rampant racism in the community.

Community Billboards

The "community billboard," as it came to be known, was soon a featured neighborhood attraction for residents and patrons of the numerous Willis business outlets on Euclid Avenue. Willis used the billboard to express his moral outrage and changed the text every two weeks. The signage was considered "an embarrassment" to the establishment elite and the staid University Circle area. Call & Post publisher and well-respected force in the black community, W.O. Walker, gave Willis a dire warning: "Take those billboards down, son. These white people will crucify you." Walker also attempted to use his considerable influence to convince the city's redevelopment planners that black businessmen should not be shut out of their plan, but he was unsuccessful. Rumblings of "take back the block" reached City Hall and council meetings. Carl B. Stokes), the city's first African-American mayor, resisted takeover attempts that came to his attention.

== Wrecking ball ==
Accused of having written a $421 bad check to a local lumber company, he was indicted by a grand jury and arrested on the charge that was later proven to be false. During his imprisonment at a Chillicothe, Ohio, correctional facility he was held in solitary confinement for ten days without access to his attorneys while the taking and immediate demolition of all of his Euclid Avenue properties was executed. The entirety of these lands, buildings and business holdings were taken without payment of just compensation. After being released from prison Willis filed a legal complaint and sought the assistance of Professor Spencer Neth of Case Western Reserve University School of Law, who is an expert in the field of commercial transactions. Professor Neth concluded and stated in his written expert opinion that the check had been paid, “the transaction was closed” and there should not have been an indictment, trial or conviction. The judge hearing the case refused to allow him to present his findings.

With Willis isolated in solitary confinement 190 miles (310 km) away in Chillicothe, Ohio, his Euclid Avenue business compound and buildings were cordoned off and surrounded by huge numbers of the Cleveland police department, and S.W.A.T. teams. During the entirety of the 10 days of his incarceration/isolation, members of the police department's Intelligence unit kept the entire complex surrounded on an around-the-clock basis. Unmarked police cars were stationed at each intersection leading to and from the area. As reported by numerous eyewitnesses at the scene, “the wrecking ball swung quickly and unmercifully”, flattening tall, multi-story brick buildings into a barren empty dirt lot. Within a few days, not a trace of the Willis/UCPD, Inc. business empire remained.

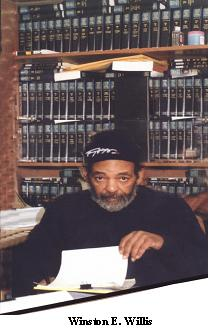
Winston E. Willis

Willis maintains that the historic pattern of land takings from blacks in this country is a continuation of slavery.

== Recent years ==
After decades in Cleveland courtrooms fighting to defend and protect his property rights, Willis has become somewhat of a legal scholar, living a quiet life in the shadow of his former empire, far removed from the life he once lived. Since the massive destruction of his large business empire in 1982, one singular obsession has occupied his mind to the exclusion of all else: “Payment for my lands and my federally guaranteed relocation benefits.” Most recently in his ongoing quest, he prepared a Petition for Writ of Mandamus to the United States Supreme Court. His petition was accepted and docketed. A short time later, however, he received word of the High Court's denial. But rather than surrender to defeat and become another sad statistic among fellow African-American land theft victims, he continues to fight for his constitutionally guaranteed property rights. As noted in the reporting of hundreds of other cases documented in the 2001 Associated Press series Torn From The Land," these property thefts are just the tip of one of the biggest crimes of this country's history." – Dr. Raymond Winbush, scholar/activist, director of the Institute for Urban Research at Morgan State University.

Willis maintains that the historic pattern of land takings from blacks in this country is a continuation of slavery.

"To deny a person their right to own property is a form of slavery. I am a slave without bondage."
