= St. Jude Educational Institute =

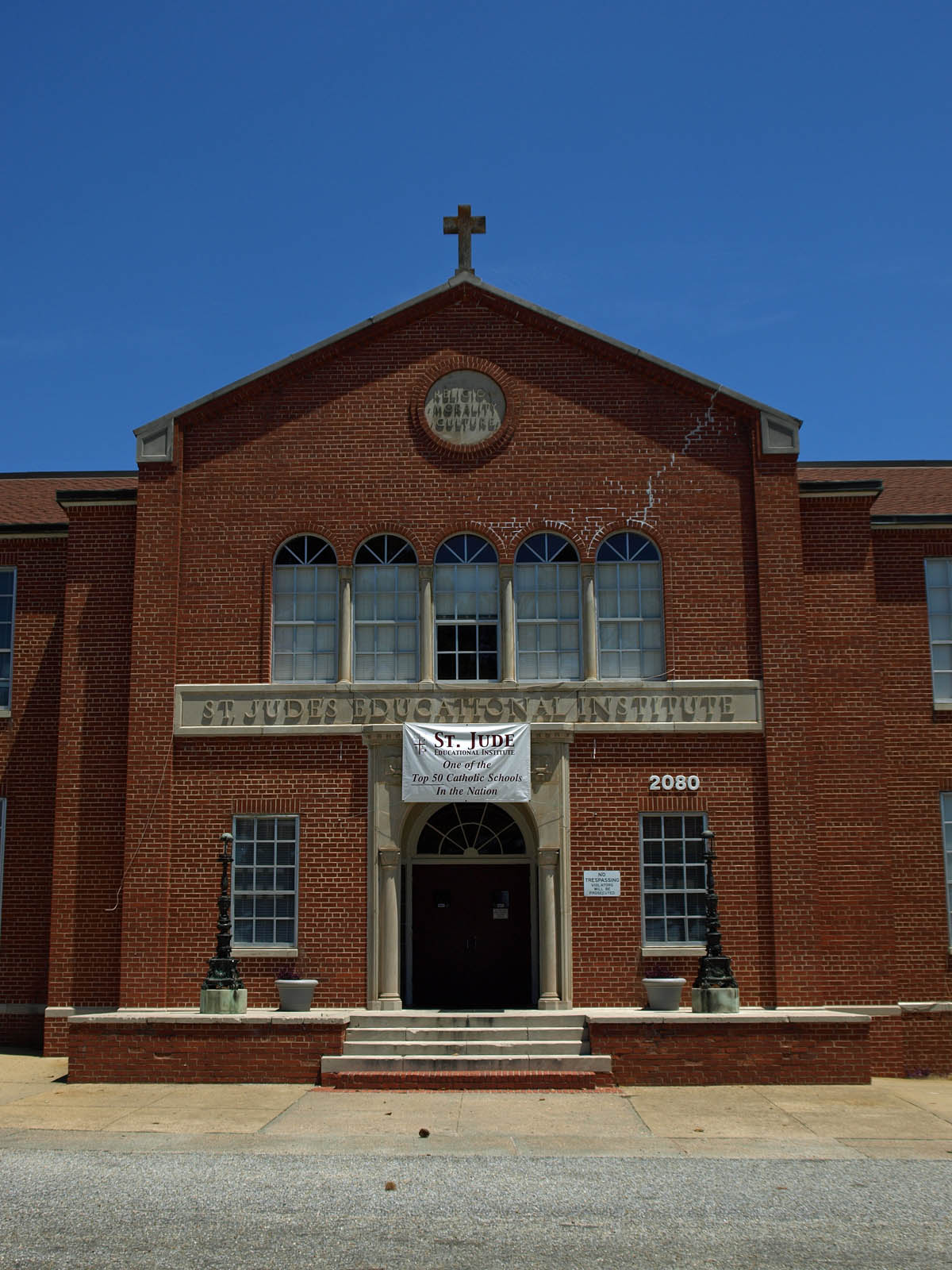
- School entrance

Location
- 2048 West Fairview Avenue; Montgomery, Alabama 36108; 32°21′11″N 86°19′37″W

Information
- Type: Private, coeducational
- Religious affiliation: Roman Catholic
- Opened: 1946
- Closed: 2014
- Faculty: 15
- Grades: 7–12
- Enrollment: 160
- Colors: Maroon and white
- Team name: Pirates
- Accreditation: Southern Association of Colleges and Schools
- City of St. Jude Historic District
- U.S. National Register of Historic Places
- U.S. Historic district
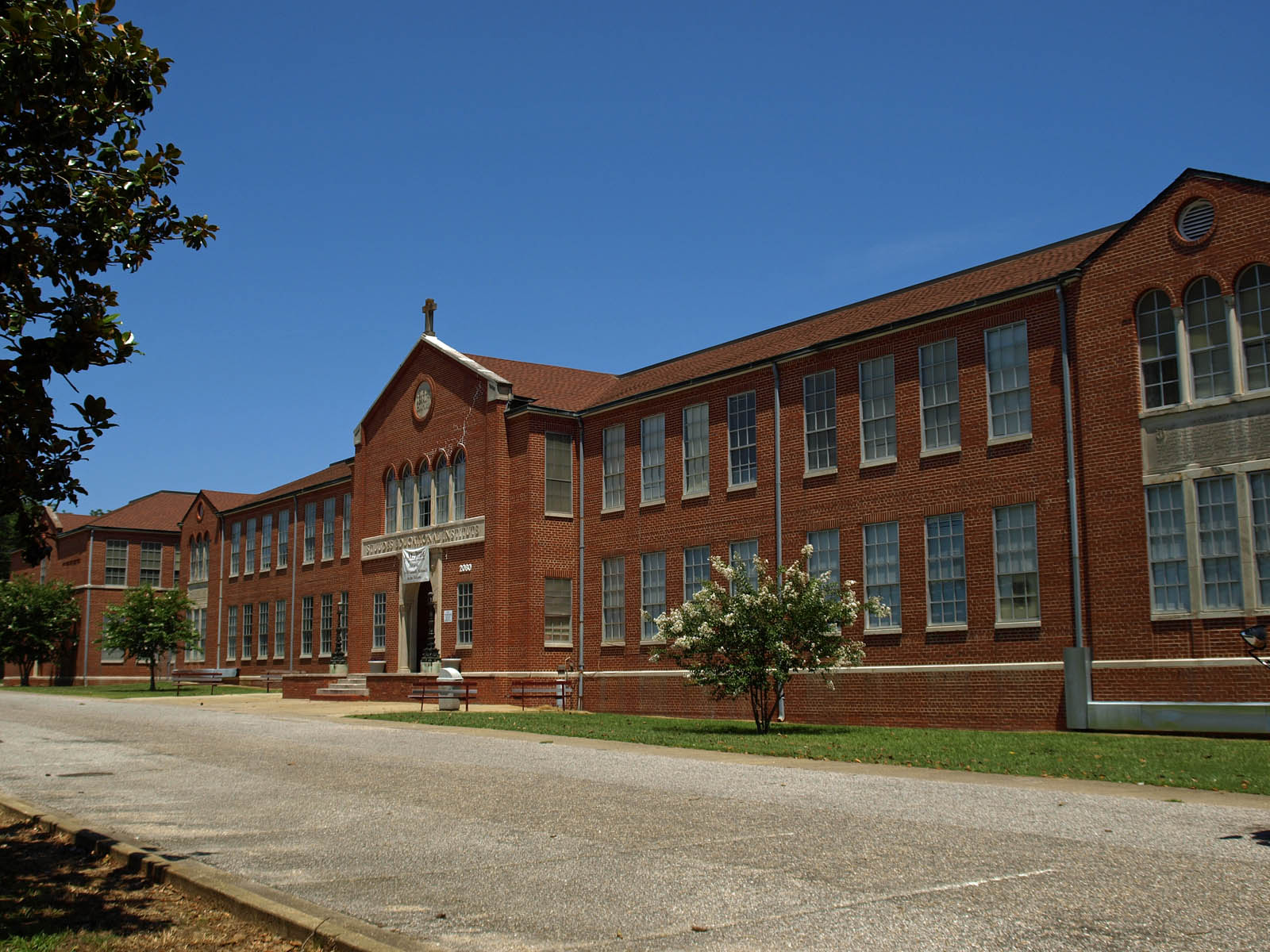
- Front of building

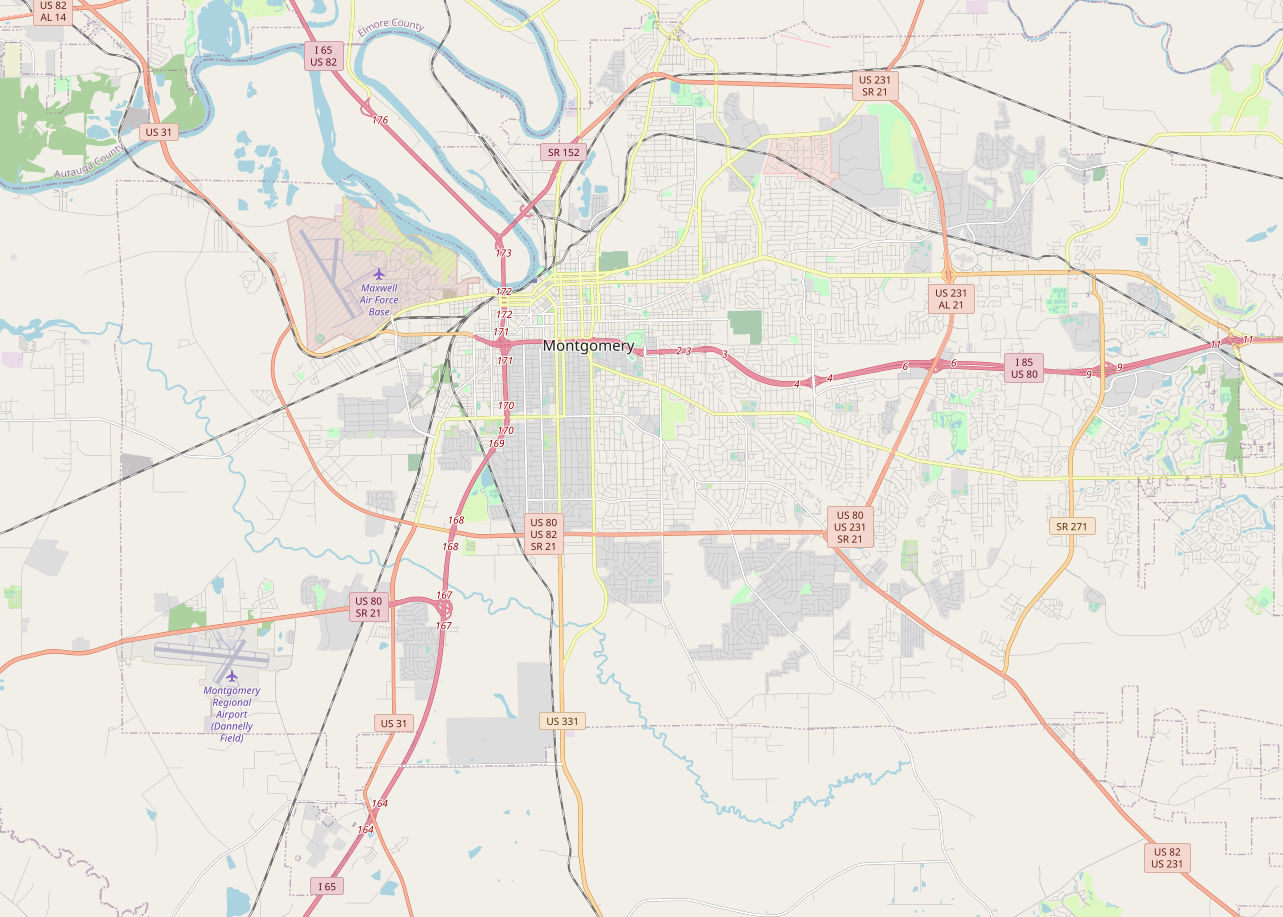
- Location within Montgomery, Alabama Location within Alabama Location within the United States
- Built: 1938
- Architect: William P. Callahan, Joseph C. Maschi
- Architectural style: Late 19th- and 20th-century Revivals, Italian Renaissance
- NRHP reference No.: 90000916
- Added to NRHP: June 18, 1990

St. Jude Educational Institute was a private, Roman Catholic high school in Montgomery, Alabama, United States. It was located in the Roman Catholic Archdiocese of Mobile, and was built as part of the City of St. Jude by Father Harold Purcell for the advancement of the Negro people.

St. Jude was opened in 1946. It offered a full college preparatory program as well as basic skills and trade programs at night for adults.

During the Selma to Montgomery marches in 1965, the march camped on the St. Jude campus. The "Stars for Freedom" rally was held, featuring singers Harry Belafonte, Peter, Paul and Mary, and Tony Bennett, and comedian Sammy Davis Jr. The campus was listed on the National Register of Historic Places in 1990, and is part of the Selma to Montgomery National Historic Trail, created in 1996.

It closed after the end of the school year in May 2014 due to falling enrollment.

== Notable alumni ==
- Ousmane Cisse (2001), basketball player
- JaMychal Green (2008), basketball player
- Frank Oliver, NFL player
- Winston E. Willis, real estate developer
