= The Jazz Temple =

Coffee house and night club in Ohio, US

Coordinates: 41°30′32.2″N 81°36′17.1″W

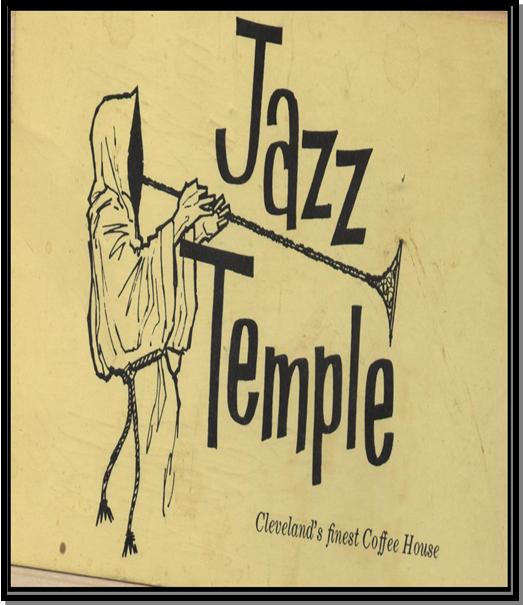

The Jazz Temple was a coffeehouse/nightclub located in the University Circle area of Cleveland, Ohio. The club's name was chosen by the owner, Winston E. Willis, to symbolize a devout gathering place dedicated to the icons of the jazz world where these artists would be collectively enjoyed and appreciated. During its brief history, with frequent headlining appearances by jazz greats such as Miles Davis, John Coltrane, Herbie Hancock, Dizzy Gillespie, and Cannonball Adderley among others, the popular nightspot was more successful than any other similar venue in the region.

== History ==
Opened in 1962, the Jazz Temple was the unique vision and creation of 19-year-old Winston E. Willis, an African-American entrepreneur who was also a devoted jazz enthusiast. A native of Montgomery, Alabama, Winston's parents had joined in the Great Migration in 1954 and moved with their five children to Detroit. A couple of years later, Winston had dropped out of high school in the 10th grade and began establishing his own businesses. First, a neighborhood advertising newspaper called the West Side Shopping News, then, having learned the floor covering business at his father's side, he secured a position as the manager of a tile store. It was in this position that led him to an unexpected encounter with jazz legend Miles Davis aka: "The Prince of Darkness". Going out on a call to answer a customer's complaint about an unsatisfactory tile flooring job, Winston entered the large brick English Tudor Revival style home and came face to face with the iconic trumpeter, one of his favorite performers. Within a short time, while he supervised the workmen, Winston and Davis had numerous conversations about the jazz genre, with Winston sharing his dream of opening a jazz club someday. Although Davis was initially skeptical, he gradually realized that Winston was serious. So he made Winston a promise that if he was successful in opening his jazz club, he would come. And that was a promise kept, as Miles Davis made several appearances at the Temple.

Having operated several successful small businesses in nearby areas, he sensed that something was lacking in this upscale college community. After making a careful assessment and determining what was needed and what would be likely to work, he decided that "high-quality jazz performances at a student-friendly and affordable price" was the answer. Then, quickly putting his idea into action, he secured a lease on a vacated building, a former Packard automobile showroom, and immediately began remodeling, with careful attention devoted to acoustics. During the remodeling of the building and the planning for the grand opening, a nationwide newspaper strike curtailed all print advertising possibilities. So, with his original plans interrupted, Winston purchased and refurbished a used UPS truck and turned the vehicle into a traveling billboard. His friend, local artist, Nelson Stevens, painted large, colorful “coming attraction” signs heralding the Jazz Temple's approaching presence in the University Circle community. Shortly thereafter, the Jazz Temple opened to immediate and sensational success.

The liquor-less establishment that seated approximately 450 people was situated on a triangular lot, then known as the Mayfield Triangle, on the corner of Euclid Avenue and Mayfield Road, near the ethnic enclave known as Murray Hill-Little Italy and adjacent to Western Reserve University. With surrounding institutional neighbors such as the Cleveland Museum of Art, Severance Hall (home of the Cleveland Orchestra) and University Hospitals in the city's so-called "cultural oasis", the Jazz Temple was a noteworthy, if incongruous success.

With the support and assistance of his girlfriend, Charlene Hurd, the club offered casual dining, "the best burgers in town, using only freshly ground prime beef, the finest gourmet coffee available, and live jazz every night." It has been described as "the ultimate 'beatnik' club". The owner booked world-famous artists from the world of jazz, and up-and-coming comics. Frequently, word-of-mouth brought visits from other well-known public figures, as when Malcolm X was welcomed and seated one evening. On another occasion, Martin Luther King Jr. was among the members of the large crowd attending a Dizzy Gillespie performance. During that time, the student body of Western Reserve University was predominately white, and these students and others from surrounding universities accounted for 80% of the club's clientele. But as is typical of jazz establishments, there was a noticeable amount of race mixing and many interracial couples in attendance each night. Individuals who managed to navigate the social inequities of the time and gather in a communal appreciation of jazz.

During this period of time, local restaurants in the University Circle and Murray Hill-Little Italy area refused to admit or serve African Americans in their establishments, which came as a great surprise to numerous jazz legends who performed at the Temple. Most of them were from the East coast and unaccustomed to encountering such effrontery so distant from the Deep South. On one occasion, after several members of his band had been turned away from an Italian restaurant directly across the street from the Temple, Dizzy Gillespie, having taken significant umbrage, immediately took off in a huff, charging across the street to demand an explanation. “Well, they’re gonna have to tell me to my face!”, he demanded. And moments later the restaurant owner succinctly obliged him. Soon after that encounter, Winston and Charlene began hosting the performers in their home for their meals. Charlene was an excellent cook and the large English Tudor home on East Boulevard became the desired location for many jazz legends to enjoy a hot meal, warm hospitality, and stimulating conversation.

As the club's notoriety grew throughout the county and state, it came to be known by many world-famous jazz musicians as "The Jazz Mecca". But the interracial dating and race-mixing triggered widespread resentment in the racially polarized community. Soon the attempted intimidation by law enforcement began. Some nights saw as many Cleveland police officers in attendance as regular customers. These visits were routinely followed by unscheduled and unannounced inspections and citations. Thereafter, months of ominous threats of violence and anonymous phone calls during and after business hours foretold of the coming end. Several famous acts appearing at the club refused to be intimidated initially, insisting on performing. The threats and other over acts of intimidation continued, e.g., numerous occasions in which “warning” sticks of dynamite were strategically placed around the perimeters of the building with notes. Winston and Charlene were determined to keep the club open in spite of constant death threats and several minor dynamite explosions that left damages that were reparable, even though costly, such as the one in August 1963. The only one that was reported in the local press. Finally, however, in 1965, the frequency and growing intensity of the threats were followed by a tremendous after-hours blast that demolished the Jazz Temple. Taking it to the ground and ending its brief reign as the jazz mecca.

The former Jazz Temple location at the intersection of Euclid Avenue and Mayfield Road, a.k.a. the Mayfield Triangle, is now occupied by the Museum of Contemporary Art Cleveland, moCa.

== Notable headliners ==
Musicians:

- Miles Davis
- Cannonball Adderley
- Horace Silver
- John Coltrane
- Herbie Hancock
- Gerry Mulligan
- Dizzie Gillespie
- Milt Jackson
- Philly Joe Jones
- Sonny Rollins
- Donald Byrd
- Jimmy Heath
- Oscar Peterson
- Art Blakey and the Jazz Messengers
- The Ramsey Lewis Trio
- Stan Getz
- Dave Brubeck

Vocalists

- Sarah Vaughan
- Dinah Washington
- Gloria Lynne

Comedians

- Dick Gregory
- Redd Foxx
- George Carlin
- Richard Pryor
- Nipsey Russell
- Bill Cosby

Other notables

- Malcolm X
- Dr. Martin Luther King Jr.
- Stokely Carmichael

== See also ==
- Euclid Avenue and Mayfield Road Today
