= Hough riots =

Civil unrest and rioting in Cleveland, Ohio in 1966

- Part of Ghetto riots
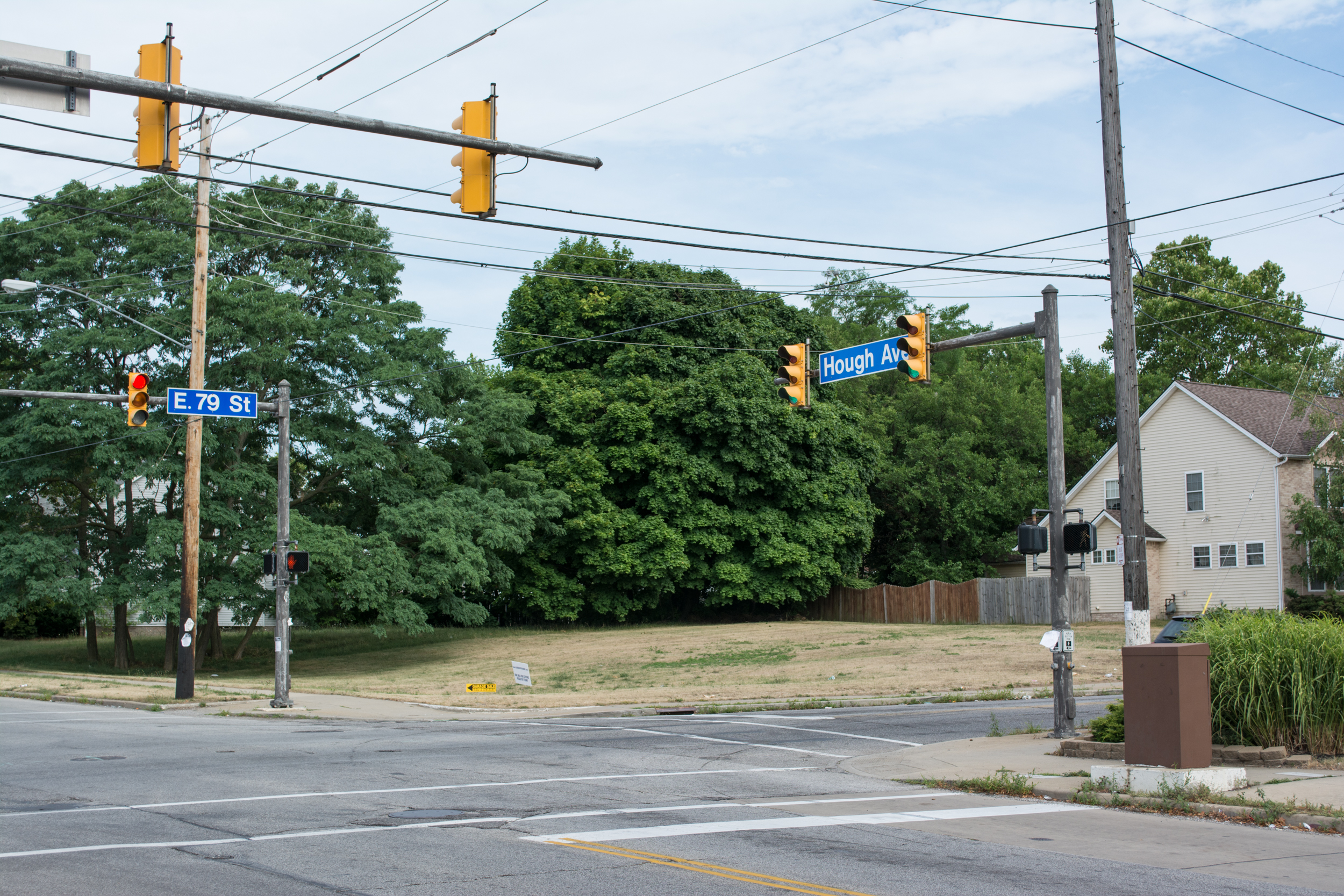
- Now-empty lot at the intersection of E. 79th Street and Hough Ave. where the Seventy-Niner's Café once stood
- Date: July 18–23, 1966
- Location: Hough neighborhood, Cleveland, Ohio, U.S. 41.5092°N 81.6346°W
- Caused by: Racial tension, poverty, racial segregation
- Methods: Widespread gunfire, rioting, looting, assault, arson, protests, property damage, murder

Parties
Residents of Hough	Cleveland Police Department

Number
Several hundred to more than a thousand	2,100 policemen 1,700 Ohio National Guardsmen

Casualties
- Deaths: 4
- Injuries: 50
- Arrested: approx. 275

The Hough riots were riots in the predominantly African-American community of Hough (pronounced "Huff") in Cleveland, Ohio, United States which took place from July 18 to 23, 1966. During the riots, four African Americans were killed and 50 people were injured. There were 275 arrests and numerous incidents of arson and firebombings. City officials at first blamed black nationalist and communist organizations for the riots, but historians generally dismiss these claims today, arguing that the cause of the Hough Riots were primarily poverty and racism. The riots caused rapid population loss and economic decline in the area, which lasted at least five decades after the riots.

== Beginning of the riot ==
=== Hough in 1966 ===
During the 1950s, middle-class whites largely left the neighborhood of Hough in Cleveland, Ohio, and working-class African Americans moved in. By 1966, more than 66,000 people, nearly 90 percent of them African American, lived in Hough. Most businesses in the area remained white-owned, however. Residents of the Hough neighborhood complained extensively of inferior and racially segregated public schools, poor delivery of welfare benefits, a lack of routine garbage collection, no street cleaning, and too few housing inspections. Recreational facilities in Hough were nonexistent except for minimal equipment at a few school playgrounds. Hough was a relatively small area, but the population density in the neighborhood was one of the highest in Cleveland. Housing was often substandard in Hough, with a fifth of all housing units considered dilapidated and absentee landlords (most of them white) were common. The deindustrialization of Cleveland hit the African American community hard, and unemployment was over 17 percent. Median income for black residents was just 65 percent the median income of whites. Although Hough contained just 7.3 percent of Cleveland's population, it had more than 19 percent of its welfare cases. Single mothers (half of them teenagers) bore one-third of the children in Hough in 1966, and infant mortality was twice as high as the rest of the city. High unemployment and the rapid deterioration of the neighborhood created extensive racial tension in Hough. Although the city had engaged in some urban renewal housing projects in Hough, these had displaced more people than they housed and those displaced had received little to no help in finding new housing. Moreover, failed urban renewal to the east of Hough had displaced several thousand poor families, most of whom moved into Hough.

A racially segregated Cleveland Division of Police also led to interracial tension in the city. Twenty percent of Cleveland's major crimes were committed in Hough, even though it had just 7 percent of the city's population. Only 165 of Cleveland's 2,100 police officers were African American, the city routinely declined to promote black patrolmen, (Note: In 1965, when Cleveland had 2,021 police officers, it had just 133 black cops. Just two of the city's black cops had a rank above that of patrolman (the lowest rank), and they were only sergeants (one step up from patrolman).) and the police had a reputation for exhibiting "crude racism" and ignoring the needs of the black community. The police were perceived as unwilling to enforce the law and slow to respond in black communities, and police harassment of African Americans was the norm. Subsequently, African Americans in Cleveland tended to strongly distrust the police. There had also been several incidents of brutality committed by the police in Cleveland in the last few years, which worsened the tension between the police and the city's African American citizens.

In 1963 and 1964, the United Freedom Movement, a coalition of African American civil rights groups, led a nine-month protest campaign against poor-quality, racially segregated schools and racial discrimination against blacks by labor unions. Cleveland Mayor Ralph S. Locher, who was white, dismissed these concerns. This was not unusual: The political culture of Cleveland had long been dominated by the mayor, city council, big business, the larger newspapers, and a few powerful white ethnicities. The city had a long history of ignoring social ills, while favoring low taxes and small government. African American protests in the past had been small and died out swiftly, and progress (what little there was of it) was generally achieved through traditional behind-the-scenes deal-making. The school protests were Cleveland's first large, lengthy racial protests, and the failure to achieve significant progress taught the black community that negotiation and legal action produced only limited results. Although 10 of the city council's 22 members were African American, black council members were seen as too conservative and out of touch with the vast majority of Cleveland's African Americans.

=== Start of the riot ===
Throughout the first half of 1966, there had been a large number of incidents (such as roving gangs of youth, and rock throwing) indicating unrest in the neighborhood. (Note: There had been 20 incidents in the first six months of the year. The most serious of these occurred from June 22 to July 2. Roving groups of youths threw rocks and bottles at passersby and smashed store windows in a series of incidents on Superior Avenue. Many of these incidents involved gangs of whites attacking blacks, or vice versa. Racial tension was exacerbated with Cleveland Police said they would not step up patrols, but rather "monitor" the situation. When black victims complained, the police declined to report the crimes committed on them.) In April 1966, the United States Commission on Civil Rights held hearings in Cleveland, during which time it gathered extensive evidence about employment discrimination, police brutality, poor housing, ongoing school segregation, and racism in the community. Televised locally, "the hearings revealed that the city's racial powder keg was about to explode".

The Seventy-Niner's Café was a Jewish-owned bar located on the southeast corner of E. 79th Street and Hough Avenue, and popular with African American residents of the community. Seventy-Niner's suffered from a number of problems, including drug dealing, the sale of stolen goods, and prostitution, and the owners had begun barring certain individuals from the establishment. (Note: The bar had been co-owned by Ben Feigenbaum and his brother-in-law, Bill Maltz. On February 10, 1965, Ben Feigenbaum was murdered while sitting in his automobile. A local small-time criminal, Alan E. Walch, was accused of his murder. Walch was found not-guilty in October 1965. Maltz ended up owning the bar, and sold his interest in it to his sons, Abe and Dave Feigenbaum, in August 1965.) Local sex workers Margaret Sullivan and her friend, Louise (an African American), were among those who had been banned. Sullivan died on July 16, leaving three young children. On July 17, Louise attempted to leave a box at the bar so patrons could donate money for the care of Sullivan's children. The owners refused to permit the collection. Louise returned about 5 PM on Monday, July 18. The owners argued with her, allegedly using defamatory and racist language, and she was thrown out. (Note: A contemporary account published in The Plain Dealer a few days after the riot began said that the actual sequence of events was confused. Louise may also have attempted to post a sign on the front door of the bar accusing the owners of racism, or the owners may have posted a sign containing racist language.) A short while later, another racially charged incident occurred, although the exact details are unclear. In one account, one of the bar owners denied water to an African American man who had entered the bar, and then posted a sign on the door which read "No Water for Niggers". In another account, an African American man purchased a bottle of liquor in the bar, and then requested a cup of ice. (Note: State law required take-out liquor to be consumed off-premises. According to the Feigenbaums, alcoholics would buy wine, and then ask for a glass of water. The water would be dumped out, and filled with wine. This was cheaper than buying a glass of wine to be consumed on the premises, and would allow the purchaser to remain in the bar.) One of the owners denied his request, and then posted a sign on the door which read "No water for niggers". In a third account, an African American man entered the bar and asked for a glass of water. One of the owners denied his request and told a waitress that there was "no water for niggers". This co-owner then posted a sign on the door which read "No Ice Water". In an interview with The Plain Dealer newspaper, the Feigenbaums denied being present at the bar during the incident, and denied that one of their employees had denied a man water.

Allegedly, the Seventy-Niner's Café was robbed about an hour after the water incident. A crowd of angry African Americans, some bar patrons and some residents, gathered around the bar. The Feigenbaums said they received a report that their establishment had been robbed at about 8 PM, and arrived at the Seventy-Niner at 8:20 PM. They claimed that a crowd of about 300 people had already gathered outside the bar, and began throwing rocks at the windows once the owners had gone inside. Abe Feigenbaum then said he went outside with a .44 caliber Ruger Model 44 rifle in his hands, followed by his brother Dave armed with a pistol. The rock-throwing stopped, they said, but resumed when they went back inside. After four calls to the police for help went unanswered, the Feigenbaums called the fire department in desperation and fled the café. The crowd now attempted to burn down the bar, but the attempt failed. At 9:11 PM, the Cleveland Division of Fire arrived at the Seventy-Niner's Café. Worried fire officials notified the Cleveland police of the large crowd, and the police arrived at 9:30 PM.

== The riots ==
=== July 18 ===
About 8:30 PM, the crowd—which included youth, adults, and even senior citizens—began to move down Hough Avenue, looting stores and setting fires as it went. Firefighters responding to the Seventy-Niner's Café fire claimed they came under small arms fire. When the first contingent of 75 Cleveland Police finally arrived at 9:30 PM, the crowd began throwing rocks at them.

Initially, about 200 rioters roamed over a 30-square block area centered on Hough Avenue. Police first came under fire shortly before 10 PM at the intersection of E. 75th and Hough Avenue, returning fire and lobbing tear gas grenades onto building roofs to clear out gunmen. The police responded by sending more than 300 additional officers into the area. They fanned out throughout the neighborhood, but came under attack as rioters threw bricks and bottles at them. The police responded by launching tear gas grenades into any crowds they encountered. When fired upon, the police used extremely aggressive tactics to find the snipers, especially on Hough Avenue—where they broke down doors and "rampaged" through apartments to try to find and arrest their attackers. Police set up a command post in a van at E. 73rd Street and Hough Avenue, but it took heavy fire from buildings located on E. 73rd and E. 75th Streets. The police were for a time unable to control the situation, and police Captain Richard Sherry called the scene "sheer bedlam". Rioters grabbed tear gas grenades and threw them back at the police, hurled Molotov cocktails, and destroyed police vehicles. At one point, police were briefly pinned down by sniper fire at Hough and E. 75th Street. Police sealed off eight blocks around Hough Avenue in an attempt to contain the violence, and a police helicopter was used to direct the police toward suspected gunmen on top of buildings and report incidents of looting. Police initially shot out streetlights, and later were forced to bring in searchlights to illuminate dark streets and alleys, searching for rioters and gunmen.

The Cleveland Division of Fire responded to the numerous small fires set by the rioters. Shots were fired at them, Molotov cocktails were tossed at them, and a mob of about 100 people seized control of a fire pumper, and the fire department withdrew its personnel from the area. Attacks on firefighters were so numerous, many considered resigning the next day. James Higginbotham, a lieutenant with the fire department, said "we're not hired to fight a guerrilla war and this is what this is". (Note: The night's largest fire occurred at Crawford Road and Hough Avenue, and destroyed several buildings.)

The rioting largely died down after a heavy thunderstorm struck the area around midnight, and gunfire ended around 1 AM. Joyce Arnett, a 26-year-old African American mother of three, was shot in the head by an unidentified gunman when she leaned out a window. African American man Alton Burks was shot in the hip and African American man Wallace Kelly was shot in the jaw by unidentified gunmen as well. A White man and wife, the Nopwaskis, were hit by rocks while riding a public bus and also suffered minor injuries. Another five civilians were shot (but only lightly injured), and three were injured by rocks or bottles, while 12 policemen were injured (although only slightly). Ten buildings were destroyed by fire, and 53 African Americans—most of them teenagers—were arrested.

=== July 19 ===
During the day on July 19, Cleveland Mayor Locher and Police Chief Richard Wagner assured the public that they had the situation under control. Very early in the morning, Locher toured the area and then later conferred with white and black city leaders. Locher initially resisted pleas to send in the Ohio Army National Guard, but Cleveland City Council members John W. Kellogg and Edward F. Katalinas both pressured him to do so. At 3:30 PM, Locher asked Governor James A. Rhodes to send in 1,500 National Guardsmen. Governor Rhodes declared a state of emergency in Cleveland. At 5 PM, Locher announced the arrival of the National Guard was imminent, and ordered all bars and cafes in the Hough neighborhood closed. (Note: The National Guard was expected to arrive in Cleveland at 6 PM, but for reasons which were never made clear they did not arrive until 11 PM.) This marked the first time the Ohio National Guard had been mobilized to counter a racial incident.

Most African American residents of Cleveland believed Locher to be completely out of touch with the black community, and the rioting spread outside the Hough neighborhood on the night of July 19–20. Locher ordered the entire police force on duty for 12 hours, beginning at 7 PM. (Note: The Cleveland Police Department had about 2,100 officers in 1966, which meant half would be on duty from 7 PM to 7 AM.) Violence began to erupt about 8:30 PM, when police arrested two men, a woman, and a child at E. 87th and Hough Avenue. A large crowd gathered and began jeering the police. Snipers on the rooftop of a nearby building exchanged fire with police, and the crowd dispersed. The National Guard, armed with M1 Garand rifles equipped with bayonets, did not arrive until nearly 11 PM. Only 275 Guardsmen made it to Cleveland on the evening of July 19, and 75 of these were stationed at the main point of violence at E. 79th and Hough Avenue, where a Cleveland Police mobile command post was once more established. Guardsmen began patrolling the neighborhood in Jeeps, with a Cleveland Police officer riding with them. In the early morning hours of July 20, more Guardsmen arrived in Cleveland and augmented these patrols. Gunfire directed at police was much less frequent than the night before, but bottle and rock throwing and looting was widespread and extensive. Most of the rioting ended about 1 AM again.

During the night, arsonists attacked abandoned houses and commercial buildings, setting 67 fires (small and large). (Note: A contemporary report in The Plain Dealer on July 20 claimed just 53 fire alarms, of which 38 were actual fires. All the fires were small, the newspaper reported.) Firefighters were able to respond without being attacked or fired upon. The hardest-hit area was on Hough Avenue between E. 84th and E. 86th, where 11 buildings burned. Another death occurred on July 19 when 36-year-old African American Percy Giles was shot in the back of head by a Cleveland police officer according to witnesses at E. 86th Street and Hough Avenue at about 8:30 PM. Another man, 26-year-old Mallory Richardson, was shot in the leg at E. 31st and Euclid Avenue at about 10 PM, and 39-year-old Paul Richardson was grazed in the arm by gunfire at 10:30 PM while standing outside near his home on E. 79th Street. In all, 60 people were arrested that night. (Note: This included 33 looters arrested by the Cleveland police between 1 PM and 11 PM.) A white male, Joseph Brozich, was assaulted by a small group of African American youth at E. 105th and Superior Avenue and suffered minor cuts and abrasions.

=== July 20 ===
During the day on July 20, Mayor Locher spoke to Vice President Hubert Humphrey, and asked for the federal government's assistance in rebuilding Hough after the riots. A group of African American clergy asked the President of the United States to declare Hough a disaster area, so that it would qualify for federal disaster relief personnel and funds.

In separate press conferences, both Locher and Cleveland Safety Director John N. McCormick said that "outsiders" were the cause of the riots. (Note: The Director of Public Safety, also known as the Safety Director, is a cabinet-level officer who oversees the Cleveland Department of Public Safety. The Department of Public Safety includes divisions of animal control, emergency medical services, firefighting, emergency management, the city jail, and the city police.) (Note: Mayor Locher was acting much as he had in the past. During the 1963–64 school segregation protests, Locher had refused to protect African American protesters from violent white counter-protesters, had refused to help mediate the dispute between the black community and the Cleveland Metropolitan School District, and had insisted on a "law and order" approach to black demands.) McCormick asserted that between 200 and 300 teenagers were being directed by adults, and he blamed black nationalist groups for the riots. Representatives of some of these groups, which were extensively active in Hough, denied encouraging the violence. United States Attorney General Nicholas Katzenbach scoffed at McCormick's claims.

A group of local businessmen in the Central neighborhood of Cleveland, citing a few scattered incidents of vandalism, urgently pressed Mayor Locher to expand the National Guard's patrol area to include their neighborhood. Locher agreed, and expanded the patrol zone to 10 square miles (26 km^{2}) (centered on Hough). This expanded the patrol zone as far south as Woodland Avenue, with about 40 Guardsmen and police patrolling the Central neighborhood.

At dusk, Mayor Locher again ordered all bars in Hough to close.

By the morning of July 20, 1,700 National Guardsmen were in Cleveland, although only about 1,000 were actually on patrol duty. (Note: Nearly all the Guardsmen were 18 to 20 years old, and they included only a handful of African Americans. The state estimated it cost $18,000 to $20,000 a day ($178,615 in 2025 dollars to $198,462 in 2025 dollars) to keep them in Cleveland.) Rioting had continued during the day, with firebombing (Note: Except for the complete destruction of a vacant apartment building in mid-afternoon, these firebombings caused only scattered small fires.) and vandalism occurring throughout Hough. Police uncovered a number of caches of Molotov cocktails, which were destroyed. Throughout the day and night, Cleveland firefighters continued to respond to blazes, although they moved in convoys and were protected by National Guardsmen armed with rifles and machine guns. Seven teenagers were arrested during daylight hours, six of them for looting.

Extensive rioting began again in Hough before dark. As night fell, a series of National Guard/police guardposts was established in Hough. When a large crowd gathered at Stephen E. Howe Elementary School (where clergyman Bruce Klunder had died in 1964 protesting against segregation in Cleveland schools), worried law enforcement officials stationed about 100 police and Guardsmen around the school and on its roof to prevent it from being burned down. Military vehicles were stationed at every other intersection along the entire 50-block length of Hough Avenue, and three Guardsmen were posted at every intersection on Hough Avenue between E. 55th and E. 105th Streets. Police and National Guard continued to patrol the riot zone on Jeeps on which .30 caliber machine guns were mounted. A police helicopter (which occasionally drew gunfire) was used to help identify where mobs formed and where extensive looting was occurring. Throughout the night, police and the firefighting personnel were harassed by hundreds of false alarms, which tended to disperse their forces and allow crowds to form and continue the rioting and looting. Police later said that most reports of gunfire were inaccurate, the result of people lighting firecrackers to distract police.

Rioting in Hough largely ended around midnight. By dawn on July 21, a total of 24 people had been injured in the Hough Riots. Police made a few more arrests during the night, primarily for looting, bringing the total number of arrestees to 150. Cleveland fire officials said they had responded to between 45 and 50 blazes during the two nights of rioting, (Note: The Plain Dealer later reported that the Division of Fire responded to 91 fires the night of July 20–21.) which spread into the adjacent Glenville neighborhood, and a total of 10 buildings had been lost.

=== July 21 ===
During the day on July 21, Hough was calm, with no incidents of gunfire, vandalism, or arson reported. Nine people arrested during the previous three days of rioting were charged with felonies, the first felony charges to be made during the event.

Many Cleveland-area officials and reporters spent much of July 21 blaming black nationalists and outsiders for fomenting and sustaining the riots. Doris O'Donnell, a reporter with The Plain Dealer, wrote that "A 'hate whitey' revolution, plotted and predicted for many months" by "a small band of extremists" was the real cause of the riots, and said the riots were implemented "as if by a diversionary enemy". She reported that the police, city hall, and unnamed federal agencies had extensive evidence that "points to certain groups and certain individuals as the suspected plotters" behind the riots. O'Donnell reported that black activists told her that certain businesses had been told to place a sign in the windows or on their front doors as a "signal not to fire bomb the place", and that agitators had worked up lists (one for businesses to be firebombed, one for business to be protected). Quoting unnamed black residents of Hough, she said that unnamed organizations had created a "ready-made army", which had drilled for months in use of firearms, burn-and-run tactics, and the manufacture and use of firebombs. O'Donnell placed the blame for the riots on welfare, which encouraged women to have large numbers of illegitimate children and allowed unemployed husbands to "sponge" off their welfare-supported wives. Police Chief Wagner declared that he saw a pattern in the making of false alarms which "indicate there was some form of organization behind them", and The Plain Dealer said unnamed police officers believed they saw a pattern in the false reports of arson or gunfire. Cleveland City Council President James V. Stanton said, "I definitely feel this was organized", and Bertram E. Gardner, executive director of the Cleveland Community Relations Board, claimed, "There's a fringe element in the streets, and they're fighting for control of the streets. They've got to be removed." Gardner demanded that the police significantly step up the numbers of arrests. Representative Michael A. Feighan, a Democrat who represented Cleveland's west side, said that he had evidence that the rioters "have had training in firearms and Molotov cocktails", and pledged to have the House Judiciary Committee hold hearings into the cause of the riots.

As dusk approached on July 21, police and Guardsmen maintained the expanded patrol zone. About 400 Cleveland police officers patrolled with the Guard, although no police patrolled in the Hough neighborhood itself. Hough was so quiet during the night that only a handful of National Guardsmen were needed there. The National Guard did, however, close Hough Avenue between E. 79th and E. 93rd Streets. Most police patrolled around the perimeter of the expanded patrol zone, where most of the reports of gunfire, vandalism, and arson occurred during the night of July 21. The first indication of trouble occurred at about 7:45 PM, when a large number of small fires were set and false reports of fire were made. The only large fire of the evening occurred when a vacant apartment building just south of E. 79th Street and Hough Avenue burned to the ground. Later in the evening, Cleveland Police shot a mother, three of her young children, and her teenaged nephew near E. 107th Street and Cedar Avenue near the scene of a five-alarm fire. During the attack on the mother's car, a National Guardsman was hit in the leg by a ricocheting police bullet. Later, four policemen were injured when two police vehicles collided at the intersection of E. 105th Street and Chester Avenue. Most of the evening's disturbances were minor, as no widespread rioting occurred. Minor incidents of vandalism were reported, and the National Guard easily dispersed any small groups which formed in the Hough area. Some police officers claimed to have seen two or three cars with out-of-state license plates (each vehicle carrying several African American men), but these were unsubstantiated claims. The only substantiated incident occurred when police found two automobiles full of white youths inside the patrol zone, and ordered them to leave. By dawn on July 22, the Cleveland Fire Department had responded to 115 fires (52 started by firebombs), (Note: The number of fires responded to was disputed by The New York Times, which said Cleveland Fire had responded to just 50 fires, most of them set in a single building.) and just 12 false alarms. (Note: The Division of Fire was responding to an alarm every five minutes from 9:30 PM to 1 AM. It answered 91 calls between 7 PM and dawn.) One firefighter was allegedly shot at. A total of 30 individuals had been injured during the four nights of rioting. One person was arrested for arson and 11 were arrested for carrying firebombs on the night of July 21–22, bringing the total number of individuals arrested (regardless of charge) to 150.

=== July 22 ===
The shooting of citizens heightened racial tension in Hough on July 22. Cleveland City Councilman M. Morris Jackson, who represented Hough, had been pressing for the mayor to declare martial law in the area since the riots first began. In a front-page editorial on the morning of July 22, The Plain Dealer also demanded the imposition of martial law. Mayor Locher refused these requests. Mayor Locher also decided not to ask the governor for additional National Guard troops, saying that the riot situation had improved over the past two nights. He also declined to impose a curfew. During the afternoon of July 22, Major General Erwin C. Hostetler, Adjutant General of the Ohio Army National Guard, issued an order authorizing his troops to shoot looters and arsonists. Chief Wagner continued to claim that black nationalists were fomenting the riot, and specifically named the leaders of the JFK House, a privately run African American community center, for orchestrating the firebombing campaign. When pressed by the media, Wagner declined to say what evidence he had for the accusation. (Note: "JFK" stood for Jomo Freedom Kenyatta, the leftist president of Kenya.) Wagner also claimed that firebombing "forays emanated" from JFK House, but declined to elaborate on his claim.

Racial tensions worsened on the night of July 22–23. Initially, the night was quieter than previous nights. The police and National Guard largely deployed toward the edge of the expanded patrol zone. Cleveland police made 72 arrests for public intoxication, which they said was about usual for a Friday night. There were far fewer fires set the night of July 22–23 (only 14), and only a few false alarms. Cleveland fire investigators determined that none of the fires had been caused by a firebomb, and no firefighters were harassed as they put out blazes.

The first trouble during the night began at 7:20 PM, when a jeering crowd of about 30 individuals gathered at E. 79th and Hough Avenue as the National Guard, bayonets fixed, told an African American man to move his car from the intersection. Another incident occurred at 10:30 PM, when Cleveland police arrested 15 juveniles and three adults in Glenville (on the border with the city of East Cleveland) for harassing a National Guard unit.

The situation deteriorated at about 3 AM, when 29-year-old African American Benoris Toney was shot in the head in the parking lot of the Dougherty Lumber Co. at 12100 Euclid Avenue. Toney had been traveling on Euclid when, according to police eyewitnesses, another vehicle began to parallel him. Toney pulled into the parking lot, where police had been stationed all night long, and the other vehicle followed him. The men in the second vehicle then shot Toney twice with a shotgun through the open window of Toney's automobile. The assailants' vehicle then sped away. The police gave chase and stopped it, arresting six white adults and teenagers. Another 100 Cleveland police and Guardsmen, as well as a Cleveland police helicopter, rushed to the scene. Police later released four of the suspects, but sought a third man who allegedly fled the vehicle. Toney died on the afternoon of July 23.

Shortly after the Toney killing, a crowd of about 125 white people gathered at the foot of Murray Hill in the Little Italy neighborhood on the far eastern border of Cleveland. This was the site of a riot in January 1964, (Note: In 1964, a coalition of African American civil rights groups decided to march on the Murray Hill School in the city's Little Italy neighborhood. When city leaders learned that local white residents intended to stop the march, they feared a riot would break out. The civil rights groups were advised to cancel their protest. Despite this, the mob formed, and throughout the day on January 30, 1964, threw rocks and bottles and assaulted any African American person they found on the streets. The Cleveland Police made no arrests.) and worried Cleveland police dispersed the crowd as swiftly as they could.

Another murder occurred at 4 AM, when 54-year-old African American Sam Winchester was shot at the corner of E. 116th and Regalia Avenue. As he lay dying in an ambulance, he claimed a white male shot at him from an automobile. Cleveland police, however, said they were unsure if Winchester's death was riot-related.

By dawn on July 23, a total of 10 people had been wounded by gunfire during the Hough Riots, bring to 40 the number of people injured by guns and hand-thrown missiles. Cleveland police made an additional 72 arrests during the night. The New York Times reported that "scores" of small fires had been set throughout the riot patrol zone area, but that only a handful of them had been large blazes. (Note: The New York Times said that the Division of Fire had responded to a total of 100 fires by dawn on July 23.) Contradicting the statement of The Plain Dealer, the Times reported that nearly all fires had been set by firebombs. Hysteria appeared to be driving the public perception of the riots, The New York Times said. It quoted unnamed National Guard sources who said that law enforcement had received hundreds of calls for help from individuals claiming to be besieged by mobs or firebombers. When the National Guard rushed to the scene, however, they found no arsonists, no crowds, no rioting, and no vandalism.

The New York Times claimed that the Cleveland Police Department appeared to be contributing to the riot. The National Guard was much more respectful toward citizens than the police, the newspaper claimed, noting that "police appeared to be adding to the problem by being chronic under-achievers in diplomacy".

=== July 23 and the end of the riots ===
The night of July 23–24 saw the rioting largely end. No roving gangs were seen in the expanded patrol zone area. The Cleveland Division of Fire responded to about five alarms an hour, and the number of fire alarms in the Hough area was actually below normal for an average night. Cleveland Safety Director McCormick announced on July 24 that he was surprised by the extent to which the rioting had died down overnight. Calm continued Sunday morning, and Cleveland was drenched with heavy rains on the afternoon of July 24 which kept most people indoors.

The total number of those killed in the riots was four, and the total number of injured was 50.

On July 26, the first 528 National Guard troops left Hough. The remainder withdrew to camps around the city. Withdrawals continued until the last 800 troops left on July 31.

== Disputes over riot's causes ==
=== Purported cause: Black nationalism and communism ===
During the event as well as immediately after, some individuals asserted (in what one scholar has called the "official narrative") that the Hough Riots had been caused by black nationalists or communists. During the riots, Mayor Richard Locher, Police Chief Richard Wagner, Safety Director John N. McCormick, Cleveland City Council President James V. Stanton, and The Plain Dealer newspaper all claimed that, while the initial violence on the night of July 23 may have been spontaneous, the riot had long been planned by violent, black nationalist or communist organizations, and had been sustained by them for several days.

The "official narrative" was reinforced when Cleveland law enforcement officials formed a grand jury on July 25 to investigate the causes of the riot. The jury foreman was Louis B. Seltzer, an editor of the Cleveland Press who had retired early in 1966. On August 9, 1966, the grand jury issued its 17-page report, blaming the riots on black nationalists and communist organizations. The grand jury reported that "This jury finds that the outbreak of lawlessness and disorder was both organized, precipitated, and exploited by a relatively small group of trained and disciplined professionals of this business. They were aided and abetted willingly or otherwise by misguided people of all ages and colors, many of whom are avowed believers in violence and extremism, and some of whom are either members of, or officers in the Communist Party." At a press conference on July 26, Seltzer stated, "The grand jury saw enough to realize the violence was organized and planned because of specific targets singled out for burning and looting." (Note: Seltzer made his comments even though the grand jury had only that day finished touring Hough, and had yet to hear testimony from any witnesses.) The report strongly praised the Cleveland Police for their courage and restraint during the crisis. Although it issued no indictments, the grand jury specifically named Lewis G. Robinson, director of JFK House and organizer of the Medgar Evers Rifle Club; Harllel Jones, a city sewer department employee; and Albert D. Ware-Bey, a member of several clubs to which Robinson and Jones belonged. (Note: In 1972, Jones was wrongly convicted on murder charges, and spent five years in prison. He was released in 1977 after a state court discovered that the prosecution had withheld evidence clearing him of the crime. Years later, evidence was uncovered which showed that the FBI used COINTELPRO to deprive Jones of his First Amendment rights of speech and association. At his death in May 2011, Jones was heavily praised by government officials and community activists alike.) Chief Wagner said he was not surprised that no indictments were forthcoming, since Ohio lacked an anti-criminal syndicate law.

In addition to the focus on black nationalists and communist groups, the report listed a number of social ills which it said was the "uneasy backdrop" to the riots. The report also made several recommendations, including stronger enforcement of gambling, liquor, and prostitution laws; more frequent housing code inspections; improved garbage collection; and much greater and swifter efforts at urban renewal. The report also listed too-dense housing, substandard housing, overly high rents, a lack of neighborhood recreational facilities, excessive food prices, substandard educational facilities, a lack of jobs, welfare (which encouraged excessive pregnancies), and common-law marriage (which allowed men to escape their marital and child-rearing duties) as social evils which allowed frustration and bitterness to arise among African Americans. This, in turn (the report said), allowed communist and black nationalist groups to find support and foment riot. The grand jury report pointedly declined to discuss allegations of police brutality.

The grand jury report also called for new laws defining and providing for harsh penalties for incitement to riot, arson or attempted arson during a riot, and assault against a police officer or firefighter while engaged in official duties. The report also called for the state to redefine "riot" under the law, to make it easier for law enforcement to arrest rioters.

The grand jury report was embraced by city officials and local law enforcement. Mayor Locher praised the grand jury for "the guts to fix the approximate cause which has been hinted at for a long time, that subversive and Communist elements in our community were behind the rioting."

The "official narrative" also received support in other quarters. On June 22, during the riot, five members of a local W.E.B. Du Bois Club—including staff members Steve Shreefter and Mike Bayer—were riding in a car. Stopped by a National Guardsmen, posters were found in their vehicle which The Plain Dealer characterized as inflammatory. (Note: The posters contained an image of Du Bois; a lengthy 1913 quote from him; the words "Job", "Peace", "Freedom" "Join Now", and "Freedom Now"; a symbol containing a black and a white dove, and a symbol showing black and white hands clasped in friendship.) The United States Department of Justice had attempted to have the group declared a Communist front organization in March 1966 under the Subversive Activities Control Act of 1950. In 1967, the Federal Bureau of Investigation (FBI) released a report characterizing the literature as "communist" In 1967, Phillip Abbott Luce, a former member of the Communist Party USA, asserted in his book Road to Revolution that the Communist Party played a significant role in causing and sustaining the Hough and other riots in the United States in the 1960s.

=== Purported cause: Racism and poverty ===
How could something like this happen here?

There was an obvious answer to this: Life in the ghetto seemed futile and hopeless. Couple that with the recently passed civil-rights legislation, which Washington heralded as historic, and the measure of expectation and frustration in America's black neighborhoods was at a peak. ... But the city's leadership was in denial. No one in the community could do this, they reasoned. There had to be outside conspirators or instigators. No group was more suspect than the Communists, and Cleveland, with its Middle European population for whom conspiracy was part of the culture, was easy to convince.

Surely, it was the work of the Red Menace or Black Nationalists, concluded City Hall and the police.

— Veteran reporter Michael D. Roberts discussing the cause of the Hough Riots

Arguments against the "official narrative" fell into two categories. The first was that there was no evidence for any black nationalist or communist involvement in the Hough Riots. For example, Maj. Gen. Erwin C. Hostetler, Ohio National Guard Adjutant General, criticized Seltzer's conclusions, saying, "There is absolutely nothing to substantiate his statement".

Another argument against the "official narrative" was that it was willfully blind to the problems which sparked the riots. Carl Stokes and many African American community leaders called the grand jury report a whitewash designed to insulate and absolve the Locher administration. In response to the 1966 grand jury report, leaders from the local chapters of the Congress of Racial Equality, National Association for the Advancement of Colored People, National Association of Social Workers, National Council of Churches, Negro American Labor Council, and Urban League, in association with the Hough Area Council (a neighborhood improvement association), Hough Community Opportunity Board (the Hough neighborhood branch of the Council for Economic Opportunities in Greater Cleveland, a private nonprofit which served low-income people), the local Negro Pastors' Association, and the Wade Park Citizens' Association created the Citizens' Committee for Review of the Grand Jury Report. After holding several public hearings, during which extensive testimony about police brutality during the riot was heard, (Note: Testimony before the Citizens' Committee for Review also indicated that most Cleveland police refused to wear identification badges, which indicates a planned, overly aggressive response by the police. One citizen reported asking an officer why he wore no badge; the officer claimed it was because badges could rip a shirt during a scuffle and police didn't want to pay for new shirts.) the panel released its own report on October 5, 1966. The citizens' committee report condemned the grand jury report as specious, and concluded that despair, police brutality, poverty, racism, and a city government heedless of the plight of African Americans caused the riots. The citizens' panel requested that the grand jury report be legally quashed; that fair housing legislation be adopted by the city; that the city immediately implement a 16-point urban renewal agreement previously negotiated with the federal government; that the mayor begin meeting regularly with representatives of the Hough neighborhood; that the city study the constitutionality of a law giving police immunity from false arrest; that the city call for a U.S. Department of Justice investigation into the Cleveland police and their practice of holding people without charge; that the state pass a law giving citizens a mechanism to file grievances against government workers; that a grand jury investigate the shootings of Arnett, Giles, and the Townes family; and that the state of Ohio increase the level of welfare payments. (Note: The focus on a grievance mechanism was the result of extensive testimony by African Americans about racist and excessively violent police behavior before and during the riot. Almost no Cleveland news media reported on the now widely known police brutality and racism then extant in the Cleveland Division of Police.)

Contemporary historical analyses of the Hough Riots do not find evidence for claims of communist influence. As early as 1972, historians Estelle Zannes and Mary Jean Thomas pointed out that no evidence existed to implicate either black nationalists or communist organizations in the Hough Riots. Cleveland historian Leonard N. Moore notes that two undercover Cleveland police officers spent more than a year investigating the JFK House and black nationalist and communist groups in Hough, but found no evidence that these groups or individuals had planned or sustained the riots. In 2003, noted Ohio historian George W. Knepper called the grand jury report a "simplistic and comfortable conclusion" the nearly all-white city administration was more than willing to accept. Kyle Swenson, writing in Cleveland Scene in July 2016, called the grand jury report "almost laughable. Instead of scratching at the deep economic and political grievances that led to a mass group of people to express their frustrations through violence, the official Cuyahoga County explanation was that the commies did it. Seriously." The report, he said, helped reinforce racial tension in Cleveland for decades. In the 21st century, all scholars reject the "official narrative" and its assertion that the riots were fomented and sustained by radical groups, and instead point to social problems like racism and poverty as the riot's cause.

== Effects of the riots ==
=== Devastation and redevelopment of Hough ===
"Hough cast a pall of fear and resentment that took years to dissipate, if it ever truly passed", said Michael D. Roberts, who covered the Hough Riots as a reporter in 1966.

The Hough Riots caused $1 to $2 million in property damage ($9.9 million to $19.8 million in 2025 dollars), and destroyed the Hough Avenue commercial strip between E. 71st and E. 93rd Streets. Many merchants said they would never return to Hough. The riots depressed property values for decades below those found in surrounding black neighborhoods. Both black and white residents fled the area, causing population loss that lasted into 1990s before stabilizing. The attempts of residents who remained to redevelop their neighborhood were stymied by public and economic policies that led to further disinvestment.

Although Cleveland needed financial assistance from the federal government to both rebuild and address its extensive problems, the United States Department of Housing and Urban Development (HUD) cut off federal urban renewal funding to the city in the wake of the Hough Riots because the administrations of Mayor Locher and his predecessors had been so dilatory and incompetent in completing projects. HUD also cancelled an existing $10 million grant, and rejected Cleveland's Model Cities Program application for fear the city would misspend the funds. (Note: For example, in 1960 the city razed several downtown blocks in order to build the Erieview Urban Renewal Project. Only a single structure, the Erieview Tower, was completed, and for the next five decades the prime real estate stood empty (occupied only surface parking lots). The same year, the city began the University-Euclid urban renewal project. Intended to renovate more than 4,000 substandard housing units in the University Circle neighborhood east of Hough, the city spent $40 million renovating just 600 units. Several thousand poor families were displaced, and most of them moved into Hough.)

The Hough Area Development Corporation was formed in 1967 to stimulate investment in the neighborhood, but it proved ineffective and was disbanded in 1983 when federal funding ran out. Not until the late 1990s did the Community Development Corporations (CDCs) begin to play an important role in redevelopment of the neighborhood.

Hough changed radically between 1966 and 2000. Whereas the neighborhood had nearly 23,000 housing units in 1966, by the turn of the century it had just 8,409. The population had dropped to just 16,409 in 2000, while median income in the area had slumped to just 45 percent of the median of whites in Cleveland.

=== Toney murder prosecutions ===
Warren LaRiche was tried for the murder of Benoris Toney. LaRiche claimed self-defense, saying that Toney had pointed a gun at the car in which he was riding. An all-white jury deadlocked over his conviction in February 1967. LaRiche was acquitted of murder charges by a second all-white jury in December 1967.

Court of Common Pleas Judge John J. McMahon dismissed second-degree murder charges against Patsy C. Sabetta, driver of the car in which LaRiche rode, for lack of evidence.

=== Election of Carl Stokes ===
Mayor Locher came under near-constant media attack in 1966 and 1967 for his failure to revitalize Cleveland and address the worsening racial tension in the city in the wake of the Hough Riots. He was perceived as an unsophisticated political populist whose administration lacked the modern bureaucratic and professional skills to effectively deal with the city's problems. The city's (mostly white) business establishment also withdrew its support for Locher.

Cleveland's African American community reacted very negatively to the "official narrative" of the Hough Riots. The city's black community was divided on how to solve issues like racism and poverty, and African American members of the Cleveland City Council focused more on patronage than meeting the needs of the communities they represented. Cleveland's African Americans were unified in condemning the "official narrative", however. Mayor Locher's refusal to acknowledge racism, poverty, and police brutality as causes of the Hough Riots united the black community so strongly that it propelled Carl Stokes to the mayor's office in 1967. (Note: Stokes, running as an independent, challenged Locher in the 1965 mayoral election. He lost by a razor-thin 1,933 votes. Stokes, running as a Democrat, easily defeated Locher on October 4, 1967, for the Democratic nomination for mayor. Stokes then beat Republican Seth Taft for mayor in the November 7, 1967, general election by a very narrow 2,500 votes.) Cleveland's business community rallied around Stokes largely because it had lost faith in Locher's analysis of the race problem in the city, and believed Stokes would implement policies which would prevent additional riots.

== See also ==
- Glenville shootout, a gunfight and subsequent riot in Cleveland in 1968
- List of incidents of civil unrest in the United States

== Bibliography ==
- Clavel, Pierre (1986). The Progressive City: Planning and Participation, 1969–1984. New Brunswick, N.J.: Rutgers University Press. ISBN 9780813511191.
- Hundley, James R. Jr. (1970). "The Dynamics of Recent Ghetto Riots". In Chikota, Richard A. (ed.). Riot in the Cities: An Analytical Symposium on the Causes and Effects. Rutherford, N.J.: Fairleigh Dickinson University Press. ISBN 9780838674437.
- Kerr, Daniel (2011). Derelict Paradise: Homelessness and Urban Development in Cleveland, Ohio. Amherst, Mass.: University of Massachusetts Press. ISBN 9781558498495.
- Kerr, Daniel (2012). "Who Burned Cleveland, Ohio? The Forgotten Fires of the 1970s". In Bankoff, Greg; Lübken, Uwe; Sand, Jordan (eds.). Flammable Cities: Urban Conflagration and the Making of the Modern World. Madison, Wisc.: The University of Wisconsin Press. ISBN 9780299283841.
- Knepper, George W. (2003). Ohio and Its People. Kent, Ohio: Kent State University Press. ISBN 9780873387910.
- Krumholz, Norman (1999). "Cleveland: The Hough and Central Neighborhoods—Empowerment Zones and Other Urban Policies". In Keating, William Dennis; Krumholz, Norman (eds.). Rebuilding Urban Neighborhoods: Achievements, Opportunities, and Limits. Thousand Oaks, Calif.: Sage Publications. ISBN 9780761906919.
- Luce, Phillip Abbott (1967). Road to Revolution: Communist Guerrilla Warfare in the U.S.A. San Diego: Viewpoint Books.
- Masotti, Louis H.; Corsi, Jerome R. (1969). Shoot-Out in Cleveland: Black Militants and the Police. A Report to the National Commission on the Causes and Prevention of Violence. Washington, D.C.: U.S. Government Printing Office.
- Moore, Leonard N. (2001). "Carl Stokes: Mayor of Cleveland". In Colburn, David R.; Adler, Jeffrey S. (eds.). African-American Mayors: Race, Politics, and the American City. Urbana, Ill.: University of Illinois Press. ISBN 9780252026348.
- Moore, Leonard N. (2002). Carl B. Stokes and the Rise of Black Political Power. Urbana, Ill.: University of Illinois Press. ISBN 9780252027604.
- Nelson, William E.; Meranto, Philip J. (1977). Electing Black Mayors: Political Action in the Black Community. Columbus, Ohio: Ohio State University Press. ISBN 9780814202708.
- Parker, Thomas F. (1974). Violence in the U.S. New York: Facts On File. ISBN 9780871962294.
- Robinson, Marsha R. (2013). Purgatory Between Kentucky and Canada: African Americans in Ohio. Newcastle upon Tyne: Cambridge Scholars Publishing. ISBN 9781443866415.
- Sobel, Lester (1967). Civil Rights, 1960–66. New York: Facts On File.
- Stradling, David; Stradling, Richard (2015). Where the River Burned: Carl Stokes and the Struggle to Save Cleveland. Ithaca, N.Y.: Cornell University Press. ISBN 9780801453618.
- Swiderski, David M. (September 2013). Approaches to Black Power: African American Grassroots Political Struggle in Cleveland, Ohio, 1960–1966 (Ph.D.). University of Massachusetts-Amherst.
- Williams, Regennia N. (2014). "Cleveland (Ohio) Riot of 1966". In Gallagher, Charles A.; Lippard, Cameron D. (eds.). Race and Racism in the United States: An Encyclopedia of the American Mosaic. Santa Barbara, Calif.: Greenwood Press. ISBN 9781440803451.
- Zannes, Estelle; Thomas, Mary Jean (1972). Checkmate in Cleveland: The Rhetoric of Confrontation During the Stokes Years. Cleveland: Press of Case Western Reserve University. ISBN 9780829502312.

== For further reading ==
- Michney, Todd M. (2006). "Race, Violence, and Urban Territoriality: Cleveland's Little Italy and the 1966 Hough Uprising". Journal of Urban History. 32 (3): 404–428. doi:10.1177/0096144205282573. ISSN 0096-1442. S2CID 133720439.
