= Cleveland Convention Center labor dispute of 1963 =

Dispute over institutional racism

- Date: June 24 to September 15, 1963
- Location: Cleveland, Ohio, U.S. 41.503082°N 81.696004°W
- Caused by: Racial discrimination by labor unions
- Methods: Threatened picketing
- Result: Signed agreement to admit members

Parties
United Freedom Movement	IBEW Local 38; Plumbers Local 55; Sheet Metal Workers' Local 65; Structural Iron Workers Local 17

The Cleveland Convention Center labor dispute of 1963 was a dispute between the United Freedom Movement (UFM) and four local unions belonging to the AFL–CIO over the unions' institutional racism against African Americans. The dispute occurred during the construction of the Cleveland Convention Center in downtown Cleveland, Ohio. The dispute erupted on June 25, 1963, when the UFM (a coalition of African American civic groups and their supporters) threatened to begin picketing the convention center construction site. After a series of preliminary stop-gap agreements, a final agreement was reached on July 20 in which the unions agreed to admit blacks as members. This agreement collapsed within four days, and a new, more extensive agreement was reached on August 4 after intervention by the United States Department of Labor. Difficulties ensued implementing this agreement, but the threat of picketing ended on September 15. The August 4 agreement was hailed by civil rights groups and the government as a breakthrough in race relations in the American labor movement.

== Approving a convention center in 1960 ==
After four years of effort, the Cleveland City Council approved on June 6, 1960, construction of a $10 million ($108,830,146 in 2025 dollars), 226,000-square-foot (21,000 m^{2}) convention center beneath the northern sections of the Cleveland Mall. The project also included a reception pavilion, which would be erected against the west side of the existing Public Auditorium. On November 9, 1960, Cleveland voters approved the bond levy to build this convention center.

Groundbreaking for the convention center occurred on July 17, 1961, and site preparation began on July 19. The foundation neared completion on May 25, and the underground convention center's floor and walls were completed at the end of July 1962. Structural work on the exhibit hall, roof, and reception pavilion began in August 1962.

Structural steel for the roof began arriving in the spring of 1963. Work was progressing so well, in May 1963 construction officials estimated that the convention center—whose total cost was now estimated at $14 million ($147,228,261 in 2025 dollars)—would be completed in August 1964. The roof of the convention center began to be erected in early summer.

== Conflict erupts ==
On June 24, 1963, the United Freedom Movement (UFM), a local civil rights organization, (Note: The United Freedom Movement was founded in June 1963 by the Cleveland NAACP to bring together the city's African American community groups in a united front. Previously, these groups had been divided by class and ideology. Middle-class, educated African Americans looked to religious leaders, the NAACP, and the Urban League, which tended to work behind the scenes for incremental change. Poor, less-educated African Americans (by far the majority of blacks in the city) looked to militant groups like the Congress of Racial Equality, which engaged in public protest and demanded immediate, radical change. Although the UFM had 60 member organizations, it made decisions swiftly—which often left politicians and governmental organizations angry, as they had little time to discuss and debate UFM's demands.) announced it would begin picketing the convention center construction site within five to seven days. The issue was racism: Some labor unions, which controlled all the work at the site through what was effectively a closed shop, (Note: Although the Labor Management Relations Act of 1947 (or Taft-Hartley Act) outlawed the closed shop in 1947, the relationship effectively continued in a large number of workplaces for many years. Plumbers union officials emphasized that there was no closed shop in Cleveland.) refused to permit African Americans as members. The UFM and NAACP pointed out that there were just 27 African Americans at work on the site out of a total workforce of 300. The Cleveland Community Relations Board, (Note: The board was established by the Cleveland City Council in 1954 to improve racial and ethnic relations in the city.) supported by Cleveland Mayor Ralph S. Locher, Chamber of Commerce president Curtis Lee Smith, and Cleveland Federation of Labor president Patrick J. O'Malley, met with UFM representatives on Friday, June 28, in attempt to head off Monday's picketing. At the meeting, the UFM demanded that four unions which had no African American members—Electricians' Local 38, Plumbers Local 55, Sheet Metal Workers Local 65, and Structural Iron Workers Local 17—hire minority workers immediately. (Note: According to the UFM, the Laborers' Union, Cement Workers, and Carpenters Union were not racially biased.) (Note: In union parlance, apprentices were the lowest level of union member. Their membership was considered temporary, and qualified on their continuing advancement in the profession. A journeyman was a permanent union member, but one who needed extensive additional on-the-job training in order to become proficient at their task. Journeymen were paid much lower wages than a master craftsman, and would be able to get jobs only if no master craftsmen were available. The Plumbers had 1,350 members and the Iron Workers 1,400 members. Neither had any African Americans as members at any level. The Electrical Workers had 1,300 members, of whom just three were journeymen African Americans. The Sheet Metal Workers had 1,200 members, with 30 to 35 of them African American apprentices or journeymen.) The four unions claimed they were not discriminating, but simply could not find workers qualified to pass the licensure tests required by union rules. The talks failed, and it was unclear if the UFM would picket prior to the next planned meeting, on July 11.

On July 2, plumbing contractor The Smith & Oby Company agreed to hire to black plumbers from the union list. Plumbers Local 55 agreed to meet on July 19 to screen applicants. Cleveland Urban League executive director Ernest C. Cooper called the decision a "major breakthrough", a "decision [that] would set a national precedent". The UFM and unions continued to meet daily until July 14. While the Iron Workers pledged to put African Americans on the job, the plumbers and electrical workers only pledged to screen applicants for union membership. Mayor Locher admitted that this was not progress. As the UFM called for "thousands" picketers to show up at the site on July 15, Thomas E. McDonald, president of the Cleveland Building and Construction Trades Department, AFL–CIO (BCTD), asked the organization to back off on its demand for immediate change.

UFM agreed to postpone its planned July 15 picketing, but refused to any additional meetings unless outside help was brought in. Mayor Locher subsequently called for help from AFL–CIO national president George Meany and President's Committee on Equal Employment Opportunity chairman Hobart Taylor, Jr. The UFM also demanded that the plumbers local admit and place on the job at least two journeymen plumbers, and that the electrical workers admit and place on the job at least three journeyman electricians. As the UFM and local unions waited Meany and Taylor's response, the plumbers and sheet metal workers agreed to admit African Americans as journeymen. The UFM praised these decisions, and agreed to a July 19 meeting. But that meeting would be the last if no final agreement was reached, it said. It would seek to stop construction completely through mass picketing, and Mayor Locher worried that critical bond issues already scheduled for the November ballot would fail if that happened. Meany sent Donald S. Slaiman, director of the Civil Rights Division of the AFL–CIO, to sit on the July 19 meeting.

At its membership meeting on July 19, Plumbers Local 55 voted to halt processing of African American applications for examination, and to refuse to allow African Americans whose application had been accepted to be examined.

== July 20 agreement by unions to admit blacks ==
No final agreement was reached on July 19, but the electrical workers union agreed to admit two African American apprentices. (Note: The UFM had pushed for three.) The iron workers and sheet metal workers agreed to take similar action. The talks were productive enough that the parties agreed to meet on July 20. At a six-hour session, attended by Slaiman and Cicero Scott of the U.S. Department of Labor, (Note: Cleveland native Cicero Scott was an organizer for the American Federation of Labor in the 1940s. He became embroiled in a political controversy in 1956 when he backed an African American Republican, Charles H. Loeb, in an election in which local labor unions had backed the white incumbent, Charles Vanik. Scott was sent to Cincinnati. In 1962, Scott was appointed an Industrial Training Adviser in the Bureau of Apprenticeship and Training in the U.S. Department of Labor.) the plumbers union agreed to process 15 or 16 journeymen applications for craftsman membership. (Note: The UFM had pushed for immediate granting of craftsman membership, without additional processing or examination.) Plumbing contractor Smith & Oby agreed to hire at least two black journeymen as well.

On Monday, July 22, Smith & Oby hired two African Americans, William R. Baker and Theodius Hilliard, Jr. But Plumbers Local 55 refused to allow the two to join the union despite the agreement reached on Saturday. The union claimed it had agreed to only "further process" 15 applications, not to grant membership to anyone. On July 23, 55 plumbers, pipefitters, and asbestos workers walked out on strike to protest the hiring of the two non-union workers. An early morning meeting with Locher proved fruitless. At midday, Edward F. Domas, general organizer for the United Association (UA; the national plumbers union), flew to Cleveland. He met with local union leaders and Locher in the afternoon, at which time the local's leaders agreed to admit two African Americans as members. Domas emerged from the meeting blaming inadequate notice from the contractor for the labor dispute.

After the July 23 concessions, Frank Evans, labor consultant to the UFM, said the body would seek to end all federal aid to all projects which discriminated. (Note: Evans was an international board member of the Allied Industrial Workers of America.)

== Collapse of the July 20 agreement ==
On July 24, the 55 striking plumbers went back to work after Domas threatened to import UA members from other areas to replace them if they did not. But the July 20 agreement began to fall apart. IBEW Local 38 reneged on its agreement to put two black apprentices on the job. Sheet Metal Workers Local 65 had admitted to membership the lone African American to apply, but the contractor refused to hire him for fear of violating union seniority rules. At an emergency meeting called on July 25 by Locher, IBEW local 38 backed down and agreed to process two African American applications for apprenticeships on July 26 (effectively affirming the agreement reached July 20). The local also agreed to employ at least two black apprentices at job sites in the city thereafter.

On July 26, the agreement further eroded after Plumbers Local 55 refused to admit any African Americans as journeymen. Local union officials said that while it would process applications for journeyman, (Note: It had received six such applications from African Americans.) applicants were required by union rules to have at least five years of experience as an apprentice. Furthermore, the application processing committee only met quarterly. If accepted by the processing committee, applicants would need to pass a manual and written examination, which was administered only when there were enough applicants (about 15 or so) to justify administering the exams. (Note: The union's journeyman application processing committee consisted of four members of the local union's executive board, and the union vice president (who acted as chairman of the committee). The manual and written tests were administered a committee consisting of three union members.) But the UFM countered that past racist practices by the local meant that, even if a black person were admitted to apprentice or journeyman status, it would be years until they were admitted to full master craftsman status—even though they might be fully qualified today.

Domas, city and UFM officials, and Local 55 officers met for three hours on July 27 to discuss the situation. The meeting ended with no agreement. Afterward, Local 55 officers declared a "holiday", announcing that no members of the union needed to report to work until the "holiday" was declared over. The walkout affected plumbers across the region, and stopped work on a wide range of large, important projects. The Cleveland Plumbing Contractors Association said its members would fire anyone who didn't report to work. Domas supported that decision, and said the international union was bringing plumbers in from other areas to keep work going. He also hinted that the international union might fine the local's leaders, or impose a trusteeship on the local. The "holiday" lasted until the evening of July 29, when Local 55 officers ordered their members back to work. During the walkout, at least 90 percent of all plumbers on commercial jobs in the greater Cleveland area were on strike. (Note: A press report two days later said the "holiday" strike affected only 500 of the area's 1,400 unionized plumbers (or 65 percent of workers).) The back-to-work order was only partially successful. While plumbers returned to most jobs, none did so at the convention center construction site, where 30 percent of the plumbing work remained incomplete. Locher, Domas, and representatives from Smith & Oby met in a 45-minute emergency session that evening.

On July 31, Smith & Oby discovered that no union plumbers were working at any of its jobs throughout the area. Leaders of Local 55 met with Smith & Oby officials on the morning of July 31 for two-and-a-half hours. After the meeting ended, the company agreed to fire Baker and Hilliard. The company and Local 55 then jointly asked Baker and Hilliard to submit applications to be apprentices. The UFM denounced these actions and threatened to begin picketing. Locher called Smith & Oby's decision "wrong", while Domas declared it was the contractor's responsibility to hire the two men. The dispute now threatened the entire project. Other contractors at the convention center construction site said layoffs might occur if the plumbers did not return to work. Domas also appeared to withdraw his threat of trusteeship.

The situation deteriorated on August 1. During the day, the UFM said it would station 150 to 200 pickets in front of the construction site's six entrances on Monday, August 5, blocking trucks from entering or leaving. The UFM began working with groups such as the American Jewish Committee, Americans for Democratic Action, Congress of Racial Equality, National Council of Negro Women, the Urban League, Negro American Labor Council, and several local neighborhood associations to recruit picketers. The International Brotherhood of Teamsters said it would not honor the picket lines, raising the specter of clashes between white union workers and black civil rights protesters. Mayor Locher said he would take action if the local did not back down, either by cancelling Smith & Oby's contract, appealing the union's conduct to the National Labor Relations Board, or refusing to pay Smith & Oby. Late in the afternoon, nine of the 11 plumbers working on the convention center site returned to work. That evening, Local 55 leaders accused Locher of favoring the UFM, and demanded that Hilliard and Baker follow procedure by applying as apprentices and not journeymen.

Early on August 2, Under Secretary of Labor John F. Henning flew to Cleveland along with Donald Slaiman. Henning suggested that Baker and Hilliard be admitted as third-year apprentices (a proposal the UFM rejected outright), and scheduled a meeting with Local 55 and UA national officers for August 4.

== August 4 agreement ==
Henning's meeting with Locher, Slaiman, and officials from Local 55, the UFM, and Smith & Oby on August 4 lasted nine hours. All sides reached a new agreement, whereby African American-owned plumbing companies would be unionized by Local 55. This would allow their highly-experienced African American workers to be examined and admitted as journeymen, bypassing the apprenticeship process. (Note: The number of black-owned plumbing companies in the Cleveland area was significant, with 39 of the area's 150 plumbing contractors owned by an African American.) Lesser skilled workers in these shops could apply as apprentices, if they passed the apprenticeship exam. Local 55 agreed to stop discriminating against African American apprenticeship applicants on August 7. Applicants who felt they had been unfairly treated by the examiners could appeal to a review committee whose three representatives would be appointed by the Department of Labor, the UFM, and the UA. For its part, Smith & Oby agreed to subcontract part of its job to black-owned plumbing companies, which would permit the immediate rehiring of Hilliard and Baker. The agreement was signed by Henning, Locher, Slaiman, and officials of Local 55, Smith & Oby, and the UFM, as well as 24 others. The UFM immediately called off its pickets.

The August 4 pact won extensive praise. Herbert Hill, labor director at the NAACP, called the agreement "the most significant breakthrough we have had so far anywhere in the country". Hill said the NAACP would recommend that all locals implement similar settlements in their areas. Officials at the U.S. Department of Labor also lauded the pact, noting that it had the potential to bring large numbers of African American workers into the skilled building trades immediately, avoiding case-by-case fights. DOL also noted that the agreement was good for black-owned businesses, which will now be able to compete for large jobs, and good for workers, who would now receive Davis-Bacon union wages on federal jobs. DOL also pointed out that the pact helped avoid a situation where black workers competed against whites for jobs.

At first implementation of the August 4 agreement seemed to go well. An African American apprentice electrician, Frequette Pursley III, started work on August 5 without incident, and another began work on August 6. Four black youths applied for plumbers' apprenticeships without incident on August 8, and another electrician apprentice started work on August 12 without incident. By August 16, Plumbers Local 55 had admitted four African American men as journeymen and two as apprentices after unionizing the black-owned Consolidated Heating & Plumbing Co.

== Sheet metal union controversy, and the end of pickets ==
A major controversy over the August 4 agreement erupted the day after it was signed. An African American sheet metal worker, Gilbert Foster, began work, which led to rumors that white workers would strike in protest. Despite an emergency meeting by federal and city officials with leaders of Sheet Metal Workers Local 65, 14 white sheet metal workers walked off the job on August 6. The workers argued that Foster was not a union-accredited sheet metal worker, and that union rules required him to work for at least seven days to prove his skills. (Note: Union rules required an applicant to work for seven days, then submit an application for union membership along with two letters of recommendation. The application would be reviewed by union office, and if found to be in order the applicant would be tested and questioned by an examination committee. If passed by the examination committee, the union's executive board would need to approve the application by simple majority vote. The final step was to have the union's membership vote to admit, again by simple majority vote.) Paul Ristau, business agent for Local 65, agreed that Foster had not yet become a union member, but said his application was being processed. The UFM threatened to picket if Foster was not employed, so A. Nabakowski Co., the sheet metal contractor, offered to keep Foster on the job and pay him if he reported to work. The following day, Nabakowski paid Foster to sit in a trailer. Local 65 ordered its men back to work, and 11 of them did so (under protest) on August 7. Foster himself agreed to perform whatever non-work, makework, or sheet metal work the company wanted, which short-circuited the UFM's demand that he work solely on sheet metal projects.

As the first week of Foster's employment came to an end, rumors swirled that he would be denied union membership on grounds that he did not work for seven days (his makework did not count) and because he had not completed the union's required four-year apprenticeship program. UFM officials said any refusal of Foster's application "dishonors our agreement", and pickets were again threatened. Local 65 leaders proposed that Foster be admitted as fourth-year apprentice and at 90 percent pay. At a two-and-a-half hour union membership meeting on August 14, Foster's application for membership was rejected. Union officers agreed that Foster's application was in order and that he was obviously qualified, but that no further action could be taken until a regularly scheduled union executive board meeting on August 28. Foster attempted to obtain a temporary work card from the union, but union offices were inexplicably closed each time he went there. Lacking a union card, Foster was laid off on August 15. (Note: This indicates the existence of a union shop clause in the collective bargaining agreement between A. Nabakowski Co. and the sheet metal workers' union. A legal contractual agreement under the Taft-Hartley Act, the union shop requires that all workers join the union within a specified amount of time after becoming employed, or be terminated.) Despite the previous day's statements by union leaders, a union business agent declared on August 15 that Foster had to follow the standard four-year apprentice process before he could join the union. The earliest his application for apprentice could be accepted was the middle of September. This outraged the UFM, which said it would begin picketing and refused to meet with representatives from city hall.

Mayor Locher was able to convince UFM leaders to attend a meeting with union officials on August 16 after N. Thompson Powers, a special assistant to U.S. Secretary of Labor Willard Wirtz, made an emergency flight to Cleveland to assist with the talks. UFM officials said they appeared only as a courtesy and not to negotiate. At the end of the two-and-a-half hour meeting, at which BCTD and Nabakowski representatives also appeared, Locher ruled that the August 4 agreement permitted Foster to submit an application for membership in the sheet metal workers union only by following regular procedures. This required him to wait until August 28 to submit his application. Under union rules, this would allow the union executive board to consider his application on September 4, and (if successful before the board) for the membership to vote on his membership on September 11. UFM leaders were divided on whether to accept Locher's reading of the agreement. After a one-and-a-half hour membership meeting on August 19, they agreed to postpone any decision on picketing until after the September 11 union membership meeting.

The situation began to resolve itself on September 4. After submitting his membership application on August 28, Foster took the next step, which was a four-hour written and manual examination by Industrial arts instructors at the Max Hayes Trade School (a Cleveland public high school). Foster failed the tests. On September 11, the union declined to admit Foster as a member. After a stormy three-hour membership meeting, UFM officials demanded to see the tests and test scoring results, and threatened to picket on August 19 if UFM leaders felt the test was inaccurately administered or graded. Local 65 agreed to show UFM officials the test and test results, per the August 4 agreement. At a five-hour meeting on September 13 in Mayor Locher's office, UFM's representative (George A. Oden, chair of the industrial arts department as Patrick Henry Junior High School) found that Foster was tested fairly. Concerns were raised about the test administration, however. Ellsworth H. Harpole, executive secretary of Cleveland Community Relations Board and a former sheet metal worker, agreed to retest Foster on the manual test. To ensure a fair administration of the test, Thomas E. McDonald, business manager for the BCTD; Emile Bourge, a representative from the President's Committee on Equal Employment Opportunity; and George Doler, a representative of the Sheet Metal Workers' International Association, were permitted to attend the manual retest. Local 65 membership agreed to the retest.

By now, it was clear that Foster's skill level was not high enough to win him membership in the union at the level the UFM wanted. On the evening of September 15, the 40-member UFM steering committee met in a public session for three hours before 300 UFM members. The steering committee debated the test administration, grading of the test results, Foster's skills, and other issues. Despite jeers from the crowd, the steering committee voted overwhelmingly against further picketing.

The UFM steering committee's decision effectively ended the crisis.

== 1964 completion of the convention center ==
The Cleveland Convention Center opened on May 11, 1964. Ohio Governor Jim Rhodes and Mayor Locher were joined at the ribbon-cutting by Herbert C. Jackson, Executive Vice President of Pickands Mather and president of the American Mining Congress. The 1964 American Mining Congress Coal Show was the first event ever held in the new convention center.

The Cleveland Convention Center was formally dedicated on August 28, 1964. More than 5,000 people attended the opening ceremony.

== Bibliography ==
- Bell, Joyce Marie (2014). The Black Power Movement and American Social Work. New York: Columbia University Press. ISBN 978-0-231-53801-5.
- Jacoby, Daniel (2013). "Closed Shop". In Dubofsky, Melvyn (ed.). The Oxford Encyclopedia of American Business, Labor, and Economic History. New York: Oxford University Press. ISBN 978-0-19-973881-6.
- Moore, Leonard N. (2002). Carl B. Stokes and the Rise of Black Political Power. Urbana, Ill.: University of Illinois Press. ISBN 978-0-252-02760-4.
- Tittle, Diana (1992). Rebuilding Cleveland: The Cleveland Foundation and Its Evolving Urban Strategy. Columbus, Ohio: Ohio State University Press. ISBN 978-0-8142-0560-0.
- Tomlins, Christopher L. (1989). The State and the Unions: Labor Relations, Law, and the Organized Labor Movement in America, 1880–1960. New York: Cambridge University Press. ISBN 978-0-521-31452-7.
