= Frank Oliver (gridiron football) =

American football player (1952–2025)

No. 42
- Position: Defensive back

Personal information
- Born: March 3, 1952 (age 74); Wetumpka, Alabama, U.S.
- Died: March 22, 2025; Tampa, Florida, U.S.
- Listed height: 6 ft 1 in (1.85 m)
- Listed weight: 194 lb (88 kg)

Career information
- High school: St. Jude (Montgomery, Alabama)
- College: Kentucky State
- NFL draft: 1975: 4th round, 87th overall pick

Career history
- San Francisco 49ers (1975)*; Buffalo Bills (1975); Tampa Bay Buccaneers (1976); BC Lions (1978–1979); Ottawa Rough Riders (1980)
- * Offseason or practice squad member only

Career NFL statistics
- Games played: 18
- Stats at Pro Football Reference

Franklin Justice Oliver Sr. (March 3, 1952 – March 22, 2025) was an American professional football player who was a defensive back in the National Football League (NFL) from 1975 to 1976 for the Buffalo Bills and Tampa Bay Buccaneers. He also played in the Canadian Football League (CFL) from 1978-1980 for the British Columbia Lions (1978,1979) and the Ottawa Rough Riders (1980). Oliver attended St. Jude High School before playing college football for the Kentucky State Thorobreds. He was selected by the San Francisco 49ers in the fourth round of the 1975 NFL draft.
