= United Freedom Movement =

- Abbreviation: UFM
- Formation: June 3, 1963; 62 years ago
- Founded at: Cleveland, Ohio, U.S.
- Dissolved: February 1966; 60 years ago
- Type: Coalition
- Purpose: Ending racism through negotiation and protest
- Region served: Greater Cleveland
- Members: 50-60 member groups

The United Freedom Movement (UFM) was a coalition of about 60 African American civic, religious, cultural, and other groups founded in June 1963 to oppose legal and institutional racism in public schools, employment, housing, and other areas. The organization's founding marked a turning point in Cleveland during the civil rights movement by turning away from behind-the-scenes negotiation and toward public protest. It had successes in the area of employment and public school desegregation. It dissolved in 1966.

== Founding of the organization ==
The United Freedom Movement was founded on June 3, 1963, by the Cleveland chapter of the National Association for the Advancement of Colored People (NAACP) to bring together the city's African American community groups in a united front. Previously, these groups had been divided by socio-economic class and ideology. Middle class, educated African Americans looked to clergy, the NAACP, and the National Urban League for leadership; these individuals and groups tended to work behind the scenes for incremental change. Poor, less-educated African Americans (by far the majority of blacks in Cleveland) looked to more militant groups like the Congress of Racial Equality (CORE), which engaged in public protest and demanded immediate, radical change.

Although the moderate NAACP issued the call to form the UFM, more militant groups and leaders joined the organization for fear that the UFM would co-opt the rapidly growing civil rights movement in Cleveland. The UFM had between 50 and 60 member organizations. Four individuals were elected co-chairs of the organization: Carriebell J. Cook, administrator of the Office of Job Retraining and Manpower for the city of Cleveland; Clarence Holmes, president of the Cleveland NAACP; Reverend Isaiah Pogue Jr., pastor of the St. Mark's Presbyterian Church; and Reverend Paul Younger, pastor of Fidelity Baptist Church. Harold B. Williams, executive secretary of the Cleveland NAACP, was named "coordinator" of the new organization. The organization was guided by a 12-member executive committee.

== Major campaigns ==
=== 1963 Cleveland Convention Center labor dispute ===
The UFM sought to end racism and discrimination against African Americans in the areas of education, employment, health and welfare, housing, and voting. Its first major battle was the Cleveland Convention Center labor dispute of 1963. Many local labor unions refused to admit African Americans as members, or did so only by admitting them as apprentices and then actively discriminating against them in training and hiring preference. On June 24, the UFM announced it would begin mass picketing of the Cleveland Convention Center construction site. It accused four unions working at the site of barring blacks from membership. The dispute threatened several important bond levies and federal aid flowing to construction projects in Cleveland, and imperiled construction on the convention center as well as other large projects in the area. An agreement signed by federal government representatives, local labor leaders, representatives from the African American community, and others brought the dispute to a close. Government officials and the NAACP hailed the agreement as nationally important.

=== 1963 Cleveland Freedom March ===
The UFM was the primary sponsor of the Cleveland Freedom March (originally called the United Freedom Movement March) of July 14, 1963. The march drew 15,000 participants and 2,000 onlookers, while 25,000 people attended a post-march rally at Cleveland Stadium, where they listened to speeches by Roy Wilkins, executive secretary of the national NAACP, and James Farmer, national chairman of the Congress of Racial Equality.

=== 1963 to 1964 public schools dispute ===
Rev. Bruce Klunder lies dead after being crushed by a bulldozer during the UFM school segregation protest on April 7, 1964.

As the labor dispute was coming to a close, the UFM turned its attention to racial desegregation of Cleveland's public schools. A significant influx of African Americans, many of them poor, into Cleveland in the 1950s had left schools in black neighborhoods dangerously overcrowded. Cleveland Mayor Ralph S. Locher, who was white, dismissed their concerns. (Note: This was not unusual: The political culture of Cleveland had long been dominated by the mayor, city council, big business, the larger newspapers, and a few powerful white ethnicities. The city had a long history of ignoring social ills, while favoring low taxes and small government. African American protests in the past had been small and died out swiftly, and progress (what little there was of it) was generally achieved through traditional behind-the-scenes deal-making.)

The school district eventually agreed to bus black students to white schools to alleviate the problem. African American parents were outraged when they discovered that the city continued to segregate students by race in these schools, and were denying black children the right to participate in extra-curricular and after-school activities. In January 1964, the UFM decided to march on the Murray Hill School in the city's Little Italy neighborhood. When city leaders learned that local white residents intended to stop the march, they feared a riot would break out. The UFM was persuaded to cancel its protest. But the white mob still formed, and throughout the day on January 30, 1964, white citizens threw rocks and bottles and assaulted any African American person they found on the streets. The Cleveland Police made no arrests.

The Murray Hill riot did not deter the UFM, which picketed schools in late January 1964 where black children were being bused. A sit-in occurred at the Cleveland Board of Education offices from January 31 to February 2, and again from February 3 to February 4. The pickets and sit-ins ended when the school board agreed to integrate classes in schools where black students were being bused.

At the end of February 1964, the UFM began protesting the construction of new schools. The school board had decided to alleviate overcrowding in schools in black neighborhoods by building new schools. But African American parents saw this as a strategy to reinforce racial segregation. The board of education rejected any delays in the building project. Protests erupted at several school construction sites in Cleveland. The most serious was at the Stephen E. Howe Elementary School site on Lakeview Road. On April 6, UFM protestors attempted to halt construction by blocking entrances, lying on the ground in front of vehicles, and throwing themselves into construction ditches. Police in riot gear forcibly dragged protestors away. The protests occurred again on April 7. That day, several protestors tried to stop a bulldozer from clearing the site by laying down in front of it. Reverend Bruce W. Klunder lay down behind it. The bulldozer driver, not seeing Klunder, backed up, and killed the clergyman. A four-hour riot occurred in the wake of Klunder's death, and Cleveland Division of Police were forced to use tear gas to disperse the mob. Klunder's death brought the construction protests to a halt.

On April 21, the UFM sponsored a boycott of the public schools. The boycott, which had been planned since early February, saw 60,000 African American students refuse to attend school.

The boycott largely ended the protests, however. While the school desegregation protests were Cleveland's first large, lengthy racial protests, they failed to achieve significant progress.

== Dissolution ==
Despite the large size of its membership, the UFM made decisions swiftly—which often left politicians and governmental organizations angry, as they had little time to discuss and debate UFM's demands. Mayor Locher and Cleveland Board of Education president Ralph McAllister repeatedly refused to meet with UFM representatives.

Tensions between moderates and militants within the UFM existed from the organization's founding, but by the fall of 1965 these had grown much worse. Militants within the group proposed endorsing African American Carl Stokes, who was challenging incumbent white Mayor Ralph S. Locher in the Democratic primary. When a CORE-led group on the executive committee voted to recommend that the UFM membership vote to allow political endorsements, UFM's president, vice president, and treasurer resigned. Arthur Evans, former chairman of the Cleveland chapter of CORE, was named acting president. The recommendation caused a major split among UFM's membership, and the organization never did endorse any candidate for office.

The split caused the NAACP to withdraw from the UFM in February 1966, effectively dissolving the group.

== Leadership ==
- Harold B. Williams - Coordinator, June 1963 to November 1963
- Clarence Holmes - President, November 1963 to November 1964
- Rev. Sumpter M. Riley Jr. - President, November 1964 to September 1965 (resigned)
- Arthur Evans - Acting President, September 1965 to February 1966

== Bibliography ==
- Bell, Joyce Marie (2014). The Black Power Movement and American Social Work. New York: Columbia University Press. ISBN 9780231538015.
- Davis, Russell H. (1972). Black Americans in Cleveland from George Peake to Carl B. Stokes, 1796-1969. Washington, D.C.: Associated Publishers.
- Frazier, Nishani (2017). Harambee City: The Congress of Racial Equality in Cleveland and the Rise of Black Power Populism. Fayetteville, AR: University of Arkansas Press.
- Masotti, Louis H.; Corsi, Jerome R. (1969). Shoot-Out in Cleveland: Black Militants and the Police. A Report to the National Commission on the Causes and Prevention of Violence. Washington, D.C.: U.S. Government Printing Office.
- Moore, Leonard N. (2001). "Carl Stokes: Mayor of Cleveland". In Colburn, David R.; Adler, Jeffrey S. (eds.). African-American Mayors: Race, Politics, and the American City. Urbana, Ill.: University of Illinois Press. ISBN 9780252026348.
- Moore, Leonard N. (2002). Carl B. Stokes and the Rise of Black Political Power. Urbana, Ill.: University of Illinois Press. ISBN 9780252027604.
- Tittle, Diana (1992). Rebuilding Cleveland: The Cleveland Foundation and Its Evolving Urban Strategy. Columbus, Ohio: Ohio State University Press. ISBN 9780814205600.
