= 105th and Euclid =

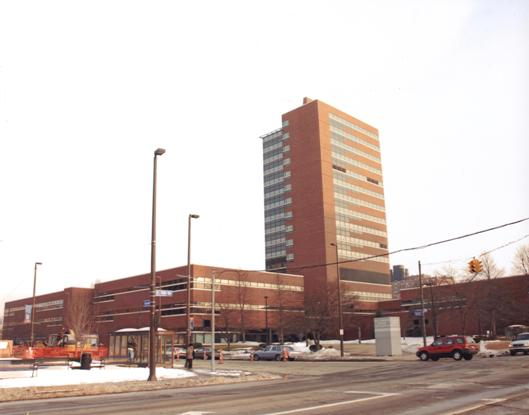
105th and Euclid prior to Euclid's 2008 reconstruction

East 105th Street and Euclid Avenue was at one time the most famous intersection in the city of Cleveland, Ohio. The legendary commercial junction consists of several blocks from East to West between 107th Street and 105th Street.

The introduction of streetcars and trolleys brought hordes of Clevelanders to the corner block for shopping and entertainment. Nearby areas, banks, apartment houses, theaters, hotels, and commercial buildings also brought traffic to the site. Appearances of legendary performers from the Vaudeville heyday substantiated 105th and Euclid's landmark status.

Today, in spite of decades of resistance from property owners, the site has been overtaken by the continuing expansion of the Cleveland Clinic Foundation.

== History ==
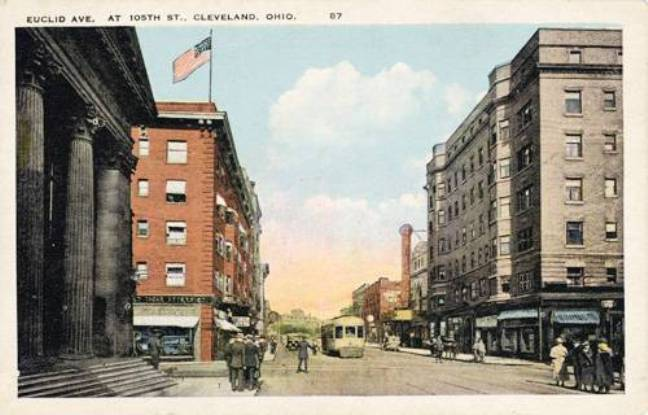
Doan's Corners c.1915

The location was once known as "Doan's Corners." The East-side landmark, which featured a tavern, a general store and a baking soda factory, was initially established by the local frontiersman and early settler Nathaniel Doan. In addition to his other business enterprises, there was Doan's Corner Cemetery, which was adjacent to the Euclid Avenue Congregational Church when it was located on the lot. Sometime in 1867 the church moved several blocks West to its new location on the corner of Euclid Avenue and 96th Street. In later years, the most popular attraction on the site facing Euclid Avenue was the opulent 3,000 plush velvet seat Keith's 105th Street Theater, which launched local comedian Bob Hope and other notable Vaudeville acts into the upper echelons of show business. These acts included comedians, singers, dancers, acrobats, freak shows, jugglers, high divers, and escape artists.

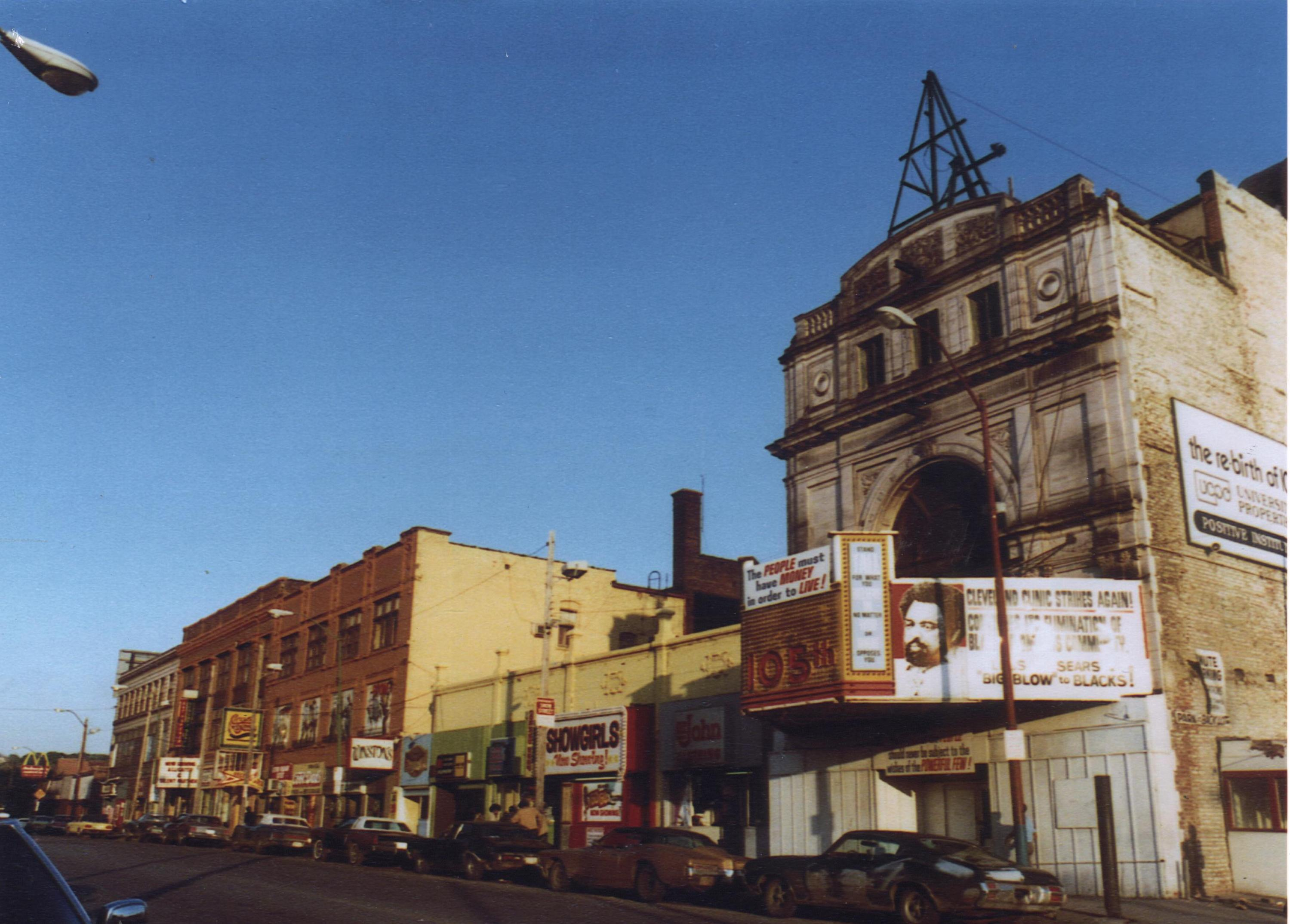
105th and Euclid in 1981

During the turbulent, riot-torn 1960s, in one of the most racially polarized cities in the country, this area witnessed the creation and rise of an urban paradise, imagined, engineered, owned and operated by a young African-American entrepreneur, Winston E. Willis. Shortly after the infamous Glenville Shootout and subsequent widespread riots, white business owners began leaving the area in record numbers. Stunned and shaken by the eruption of racial violence, boarded-up storefronts and abandoned buildings signaled the mass exodus toward the safety of more ethnically controlled neighborhoods. Having been under the notion that the election of a black mayor, Carl B. Stokes, would be their insurance against such violent uprisings, and fearing an all-out race war, previously successful white business owners left the inner city in droves and never looked back.

Shortly thereafter, seizing the moment and purchasing many commercial properties, Winston E. Willis set about cleaning up the financially devastated corner block. He revitalized this blighted area with brightly lit colorful buildings, well-run stores, and 24-hour security, and created an inner-city Disneyland. Movie theaters, penny arcades, restaurants, bars, adult book stores, office suites, clothing stores, and beauty and barber shops transformed the deserted corner block and brought renewed prosperity to the black community. The new '"105th and Euclid, sometimes known colloquially as "The Block," or "The Five," became the most "happening" place in the city, offering something for everyone. The popular New Orleans Restaurant offered free meals on Saturdays, the Scrumpy-Dump Cinema offered family entertainment at affordable prices, and a state liquor store was open until midnight.

On August 5, 1914, the American Traffic Signal Company installed a traffic signal system on the corner of East 105th Street and Euclid Avenue, the first traffic light installed in the United States.

== Blaxploitation era ==
During the early 70s, after extensive remodeling and refurbishing, the Performing Arts Theater became the Scrumpy-Dump Cinema, Cleveland's first and only black-owned movie theater, hosting popular exhibitions of Blaxploitation features such as Shaft, Foxy Brown, Across 110th Street, Blacula, Cleopatra Jones, Cotton Comes to Harlem, and The Mack. In the summer of 1972, the Scrumpy-Dump hosted the first-run opening of the major theatrical motion picture release of Super Fly. With Curtis Mayfield's soundtrack wafting out onto Euclid Avenue, black Clevelanders by the thousands lined up for the inner-city version of a Hollywood red carpet event. Many similar openings occurred subsequently at the popular neighborhood theater as the movie genre grew in popularity.

== Redevelopment ==
The transformation of the 105th and Euclid intersection and wild successes of the 23 businesses were not welcomed by the powerful establishment elite and other institutional neighbors in the previously racially restricted University Circle area. The visible infiltration of such large numbers of blacks into their community was viewed as "an eyesore". As reported in the local press, the City of Cleveland's and Cleveland Clinic Foundation's joint plans for creating a sprawling, mega-billion-dollar medical educational metropolis connecting Case Western Reserve University, University hospitals, and the clinic were well underway. Having formed this alliance to become one of the most dominant medical facilities in the country, these powerful entities also joined forces in seizing strategically located parcels situated in the middle of their planned massive expansion. In spite of years of legal battles and courtroom confrontations, the adversaries proved to be too powerful. Finally, in 1982, with its millionaire owner incarcerated on a bogus bad check charge and isolated in solitary confinement in a penal facility 190 miles away, the entire block was seized, cordoned off and demolished "to make way for redevelopment" and further expansion of the Cleveland Clinic Foundation. According to the City of Cleveland's official version of the land takings, and as recorded in the Encyclopedia of Cleveland History:

By 1970 Doan's Corners was overcome by the epidemic urban blight that claimed the surrounding neighborhoods of the east side. Virtually no remnant of Doan's Corners remains today, the area having been cleared for expansion of the Cleveland Clinic Foundation West of E. 105th Street and for the W. O. Walker Industrial Rehabilitation Center on the South side of Euclid Avenue between E. 105th and E. 107th Streets.

Although scores of other African-American property owners were driven out of the 105th and Euclid area and defeated under dubious land-grab tactics, Winston E. Willis, has continued his decades-long struggle to defend his property rights.
