= Bruce W. Klunder =

American civil rights activist and Presbyterian minister

The Reverend Bruce W. Klunder
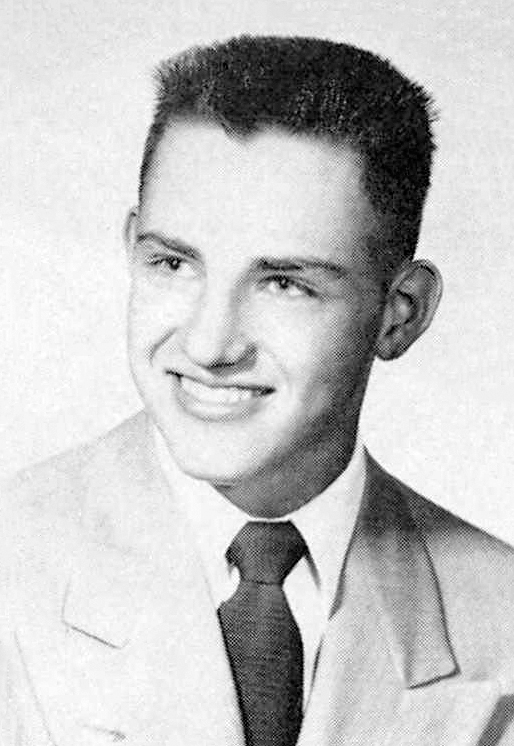
- Klunder in 1954
- Born: July 12, 1937; Greeley, Colorado, U.S.
- Died: April 7, 1964 (aged 26); Cleveland, Ohio, U.S.
- Cause of death: Crushed to death by bulldozer
- Education: Oregon State University (BS); Yale Divinity School (BD)
- Occupations: Minister, activist
- Years active: 1955–64
- Organization: Congress of Racial Equality
- Movement: Civil rights movement
- Spouse: Joanne Lehman
- Children: 2

Bruce W. Klunder (July 12, 1937 – April 7, 1964) was an American Presbyterian minister and civil rights activist. He died when he was run over by a bulldozer while protesting the construction of a segregated school in Cleveland, Ohio. His death was a catalyst in the desegregation of Cleveland public schools.

== Life ==
Klunder graduated in science from Oregon State University in 1958. While attending the school, he met his future wife, Joanne Lehman. The couple married on December 22, 1956. He earned his Bachelor of Divinity from Yale Divinity School in 1961. After college, Klunder and his wife moved to Cleveland where he was hired as assistant executive secretary of the Student Christian Union at Western Reserve University. He quickly became involved in the city's civil rights fight. He had a passionate interest in civil rights, headed the local chapter of the Congress of Racial Equality (CORE), and led a restaurant sit-in in Sewanee, Tennessee, in 1962. He and his wife had two young children at the time.

== Death ==
Klunder after he had been crushed to death

Klunder frequently did picket duty, demonstrating for fair housing and against racially segregated public facilities and racial discrimination in hiring. When the Cleveland City School District decided to build a new school in the predominantly African-American neighborhood of Glenville, Klunder organized a protest over the city building schools that would reinforce the pattern of segregation. Klunder led a group in an attempt to stop construction of Stephen E. Howe Elementary on Lakeview Road, approximately a mile south from where the newly relocated Glenville High School campus opened in 1964.

On the afternoon of April 6, 1964, about 100 demonstrators threw themselves at the wheels and treads of bulldozers, power shovels, trucks and mobile concrete mixers to prevent the school from being built. A power shovel operator watched as six people—including a woman five months pregnant—leapt into a ditch and stretched out prone just beneath the shovel's jaws. Police officers tried to disperse the demonstrators, but many came out of the muck fighting. Twenty-one were arrested that day, and two were injured.

The next day, April 7, Klunder and a larger group of approximately 1,000 demonstrators returned to the site of the school. Already awaiting them were dozens of Cleveland police officers. Moments later, Klunder, two women, and another man dashed across the school lot toward a bulldozer. Three of them flung themselves into the path of the steel treads. Klunder lay down behind the machine. The driver, John White, 33, stopped when he saw the three in front. He looked around but did not see Klunder, and he backed up. When he finally stopped the vehicle, Klunder was dead.

== Aftermath ==
Klunder's death ignited angry confrontations that devolved into "rock-throwing, car-smashing disorders". Cleveland police eventually used tear gas to disperse the crowds, which numbered more than 3,500 protesters. The Plain Dealer reported that "police ... were forced to use tear gas bombs to scatter crowds that would not clear out of the neighborhoods. ... Thirteen persons, including eight policemen, were injured in the fighting. Twenty-six persons, including women, were arrested and jailed."

The next day, demonstrators formed a silent memorial in front of the Board of Education Building in downtown Cleveland. Funeral services for Klunder were held at the Church of the Covenant. Eugene Carson Blake, stated clerk of the United Presbyterian Church, delivered the eulogy and 1,500 people attended. Klunder's death polarized the Cleveland community. Some saw his death as an inevitable result of the breakdown of law and order. Others viewed his activism as an act of love.

Klunder is one of the 41 individuals listed as civil rights martyrs at the national Civil Rights Memorial in Montgomery, Alabama.

In 2013, the Stephen E. Howe Elementary School on Lakeview Road, whose construction sparked the protests, was torn down and long-time Cleveland residents were interviewed about its history. Rev. E Theophilus Caviness of the Greater Abyssinia Baptist Church was at the scene in 1964; he told The Plain Dealer: "Every time I pass that school, it's sacred ground. It's a sacred location to all of us who were here and saw what the struggle was all about."

== See also ==
- United Freedom Movement
- Rachel Corrie
