= Raymond K. Shepardson =

American theatre restoration specialist (1944–2014)

Dr.^{Ray Shepardson}
- Ray Shepardson, preservationist and theatre restoration specialist, standing outside the Paramount Theatre in Aurora, IL
- Born: January 13, 1944; Monroe, Washington, United States
- Died: April 14, 2014 (aged 70); Aurora, Illinois, United states
- Occupations: Preservationist & Theatre Restoration Specialist

Ray Shepardson (January 13, 1944 – April 14, 2014) was a theatre restoration specialist and theatre operator credited by many with beginning the trend toward restoring old unused movie theaters into economic engines for their communities. He is the founder of the Playhouse Square association in Cleveland and is recognized as the visionary that helped motivate the creation of one of the nation's largest performing arts districts. He was involved in forty restorations throughout his career and operated several theaters after their restoration.

Notably, Shepardson was instrumental in saving the Chicago Theatre which was weeks away from the wrecking ball before he managed to work with others to develop a funding scenario that would save and restore the building. The grand re-opening featured Frank Sinatra singing My Kind of Town.

Shepardson was then called upon to oversee the largest restoration of his career; the 5000 seat Fox Theater in Detroit. The multimillion-dollar restoration was heralded as one of the anchors that revitalized the downtown area throughout the 1990s. A 2016 republican debate was held in the Fox, which is used in commercials and films because of its magnitude and opulence.

Shepardson was an avid photographer and photographed almost every stage of his later restorations. The Shepardson digital photo archive is currently under construction.

Shepardson's career as a theatre restoration specialist was almost an accident as the biography by John Vacha describes. He is recognized as the father and founder of the Playhouse Square Foundation in Cleveland, Ohio, saving the four theaters in Cleveland's Playhouse Square from 1970 to 1979. Raised funds, planned and began renovations. Operated theaters and produced more than 2,000 performances. This effort merited many preservation, restoration and development awards. Currently second largest Performing Arts Center in the country presenting over 1,000 performances per year and attracting over 1,200,000 people annually.

In 2004 Shepardson was featured in the book Cleveland Classics, Great Stories from the north coast, for his work in saving Playhouse Square.

In 2012 he was awarded an honorary doctorate for his economic development efforts through theater restoration.

In 2013 he was awarded the Ohio Governor's Award for economic development.

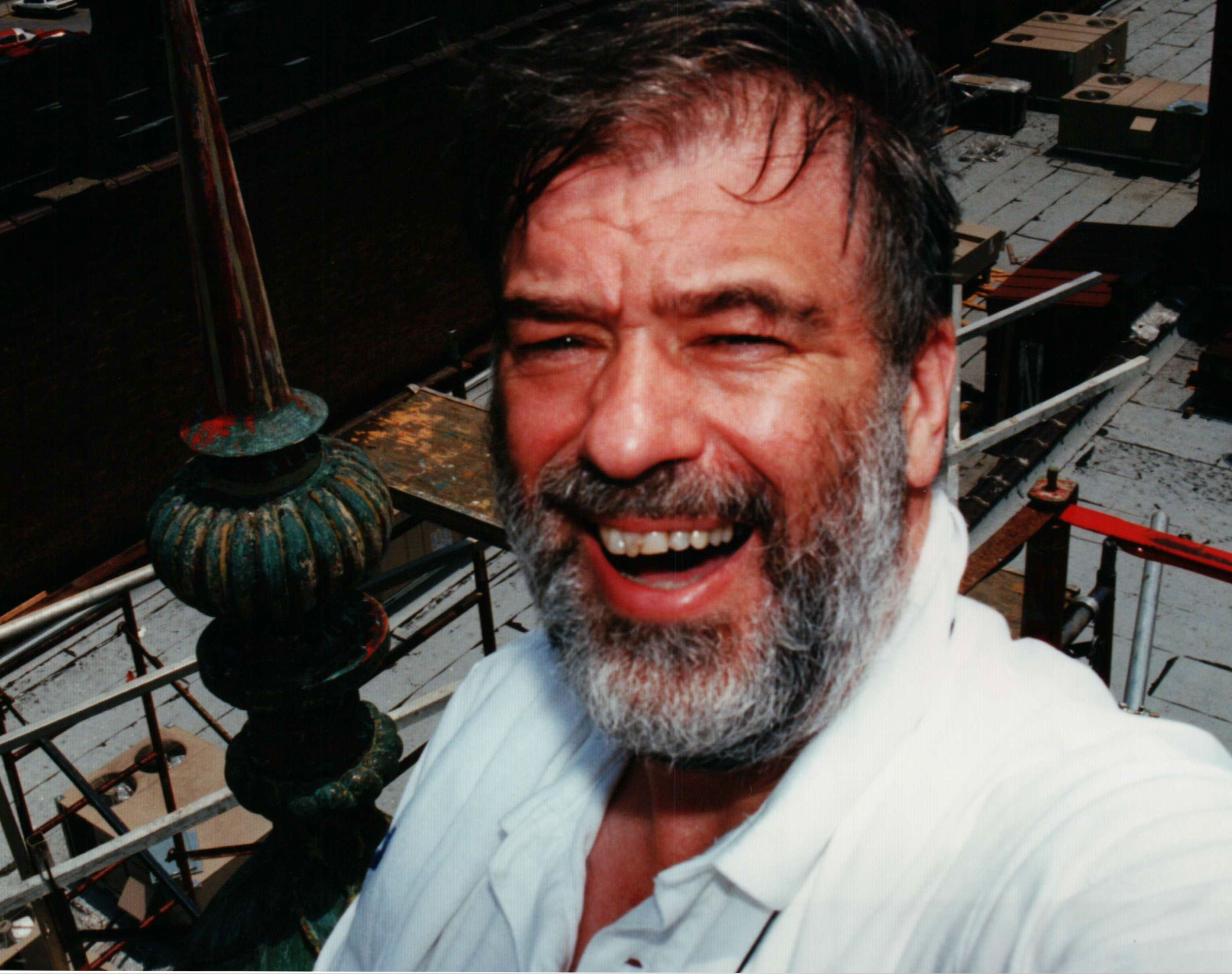
Roof of Palace Louisville KT

== Project experience ==
- Allen Theatre - Cleveland, Ohio - 1970-1979 and 1996-1998 2,500-seat restoration and renovation.
- The State Theater - Cleveland, Ohio - 1970-1979 3,200-seat restoration and renovation
- The Ohio Theater - Cleveland, Ohio - 1970-1979 1,100-seat restoration and renovation.
- The Palace Theater - Cleveland, Ohio - 1970-1979 2,700-seat restoration and renovation.
- The Palace Theatre - Cincinnati, Ohio - 1979 2,400-seat, $2 million renovation. Consulted on renovation. Produced shows.
- The Palace - Columbus, Ohio - 1979-1980 2,800-seat $700,000 renovation Planned and implemented renovation. Produced shows, operated theater.
- Palace Theatre - Louisville, Kentucky - 1980. 2800 seat, $100,000 renovation. Consulted on renovation. Produced critically acclaimed shows.
- Music Hall - Seattle, Washington - 1981 2,300-seat, $200,000 renovation. Consulted on renovation. Produced opening attractions.
- Paramount Theatre (Seattle) - Seattle, Washington - 1981 3,000-seat, $700,000 renovation. Planned and executed renovation. Began operation and produced shows.
- Paramount Theatre - Portland, Oregon - 1981 3,000-seat, $9 million renovation. Consulted on renovation. Produced variety season. Initiated sale of building to City for conversion to Symphony Hall
- Fox Theatre - St. Louis, Missouri - 1982-1985 4,500-seat, $2.3 million renovation. Consulted on renovation. Executed technical and stage systems installation. Produced numerous variety seasons, setting many career and box office records. Attracted over 1 million people per year, for two years while serving as Theatre General Manager.
- Wiltern Theatre - Los Angeles, California - 1983-1985 2,400-seat, $5 million renovation. Planned and supervised renovation. Consulted on operations.
- Syria Mosque - Pittsburgh, Pennsylvania - 1985 3,600-seat, $100,000 renovation. Consulted on renovation. Produced variety season.
- Fox Theatre - Atlanta, Georgia - 1985 4,500-seat, $400,000 renovation. Designed lighting and sound system and installation. Produced variety seasons.
- Chicago Theatre - Chicago, Illinois - 1985-1986 3,800-seat, $5 million renovation. Developed building tenant group. Developed specifications for renovation and supervised implementation. Started up operation and produced variety seasons. Pioneered corporate suites in an historic theatre.
- Warner Theatre - Washington, D.C. - 1987 2,200-seat, $7 million renovation. Implemented major programming and renovation feasibility study.
- Fox Theatre - Detroit, Michigan - 1983-1988 5,000-seat, $8 million renovation. Mediated development plans with principals. Planned and implemented budget renovation. Consulted on operations, productions and marketing. The theatre was subsequently designated a national landmark.
- State Theatre - Detroit, Michigan - 1983-1989 2,950-seat, $1.8 million renovation. Consulted on renovations, operations, programming. Brought Clubland concept to theatre.
- Gem Theatre - Detroit, Michigan - 1983-1993 458-seat, $2 million renovation. Consulted on renovations. Funded start-up. Produced the two longest-running shows in Detroit's history. Produced over 700 performances in first year of operation attracting over 200,000 people. Pioneered double programming concept.
- State Theatre - Minneapolis, Minnesota - 1987-1990 2,300-seat, $8 million renovation. Consulted on renovations and programming. Designed and implemented all decorative lighting. This project received many restoration and preservation awards.
- Majestic Theatre - San Antonio, Texas - 1987-1989 2,700-seat renovation
- Charline McCombs Empire Theatre - San Antonio, Texas - 1987-1989 Total both theaters - $4.4 million project. Consulted on renovations, operations, fund raising, and program ming for both theatres. Executed restoration on Majestic Theatre as home for San Antonio Symphony and Broadway seasons. This project won many restoration and preservation awards.
- Michigan Opera Theatre - Detroit, Michigan 1988-1989 2,600-seat, $30 million renovation Consulted on renovations, fund raising, and operations. Conversion to major opera house.
- Orpheum Theatre - Minneapolis, Minnesota - 1988-1993 2,700-seat, $9 million renovation. Consulted on renovations. Designed and executed historical lighting. This project won many restoration and preservation awards
- Paramount Theatre - Charlottesville - 1989-1990 1,200-seat, $2 million renovation. Preliminary consultation on renovation, operations and end-use concept plan.
- Embassy Theatre - Los Angeles, California - 1989-1990 1,600-seat, $5.5 million renovation. Preliminary consultation on renovation, operations and end-use concept plan.
- Madison - Detroit, Michigan - 1989-1990 1,600-seat, $2.5 million renovation. Consulted on renovation and conversion for economically adaptive re-use.
- Lyric Theatre - Birmingham, Alabama - 1991 941-seat, $3.5 million renovation. Preliminary consultation on renovation.
- Balboa Theatre
- Opera House - Boston, Massachusetts - 1993-1997 2,700-seat, $18 million renovation. Consulted on restoration for adaptation of theatre for producing major Broadway productions.
- Admiral Theatre - Bremerton, Washington - 1993-1997 900 seat, $3 million renovation. Project Manager. Consulted on programming and fund raising, operations and renovations. Completed renovations December, 1996, officially opened in January, 1997
- Louisville Palace - Louisville, Kentucky - 1993-1994 2,800-seat, $2.5 million renovation. Planned and implemented budget restoration as Project Manager.
- Hanna Theatre - Cleveland, Ohio - 1992-1998 850-seat, $2 million renovation. Developed business plan, marketing feasibility study, and participated in raising investment capital. Started operations and produced 4 critically acclaimed musical revues. Operated facility as The Hanna Cabaret.
- Stranahan Theatre - Toledo, Ohio 1999-2000 2,400 seat, $500,000 "spruce up" renovation Challenge was to "humanize" a 1969 sterile building with warm and invit-ing colors, monumental chandeliers and other theatrical embellishments.
- Orpheum Theatre - Sioux City, Iowa - 1999-2001 2,500 seat, $11 million restoration Project manager Designed and executed historic lighting. Consulted on programming, fundraising, operations and renovations Opened September 15, 2001 Received many preservation and restoration awards
- Genesee Theatre - Waukegan, Illinois - 1999-2005 2,550 seats $23 million renovation and major expansion adding 1,000 seats to origi-nal concept Project manager Designed and executed historic lighting. Consulted on programming, operations, fundraising and renovation Expanded seating capacity from 1,799 to 2,550 and from 31,000 square feet to over 114,000 square feet First time an historic theatre's seating capacity was significantly in-creased.
- Kenosha Theatre - Kenosha, Wisconsin - 2004-2014 Unfinished work in progress. Ray toured the Kenosha Theatre with owner Jeff Baas the Wednesday before his death and vocally explained his vision for the entire restoration .
- Grand Theatre - Wheaton, Illinois - 2004- 2014 A fabulous work in progress
- Madison Theatre - Peoria, Illinois - 2004 to 2014 Mission to establish a viable use to justify its restoration

== Death ==
The incidents surrounding Ray Shepardson's death were documented in a five part series in the Cleveland Plain Dealer. After making a video of himself pretending to jump off of a parking structure across the street from the Paramount in Aurora, Shepardson returned that evening to actually jump. A memorial celebration of Ray's life was held at the newly facelifted Playhouse Square in June 2014.
