= Kennedy's Cabaret =

- U.S. Historic district – Contributing property
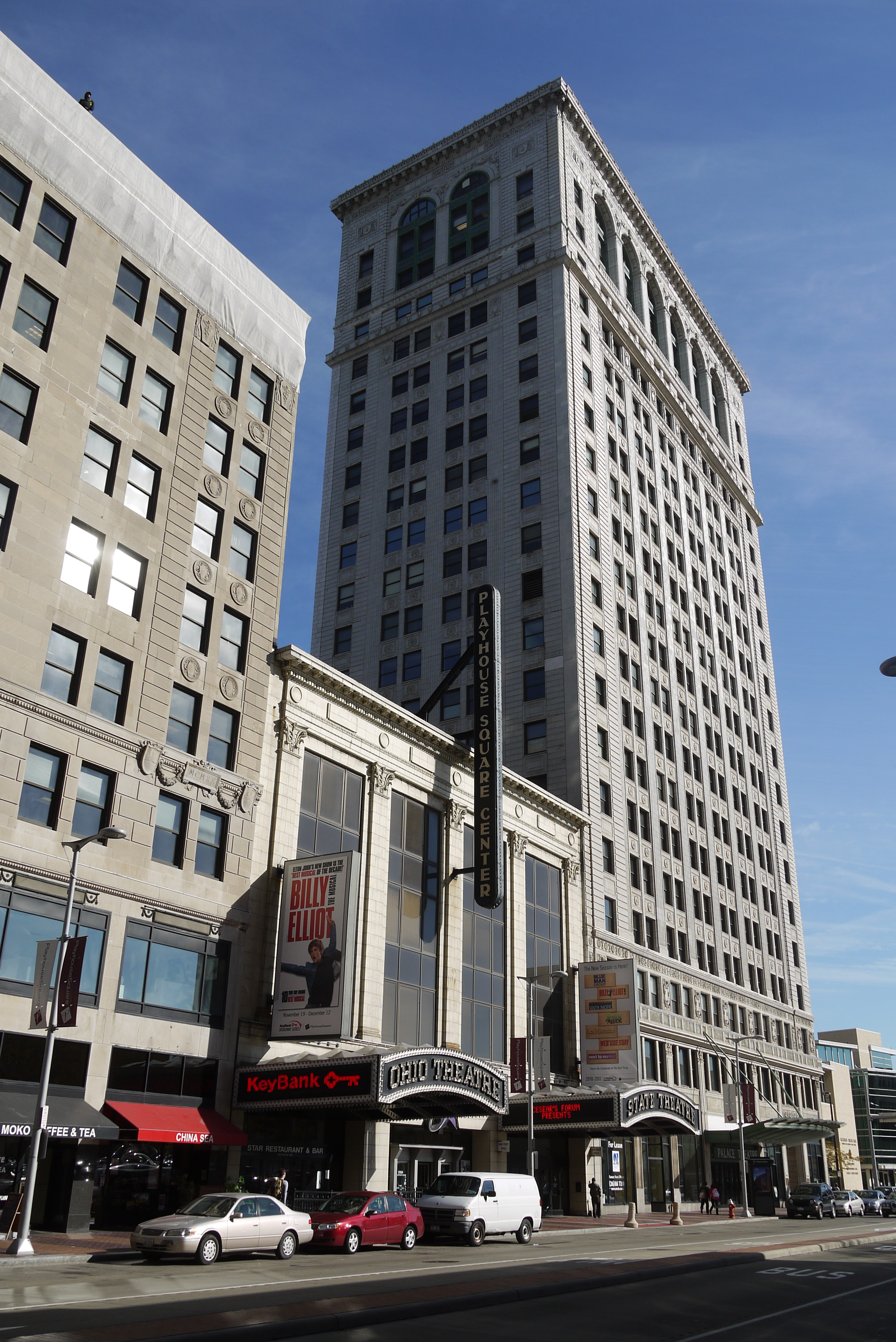
- The Ohio and State Theatres and Connor Palace are on the north side of Euclid Avenue.

- Location within Ohio Location within the United States
- Location: 1501 Euclid Ave., Cleveland, Ohio
- Coordinates: 41°30′3″N 81°40′52″W
- Built: 1921
- Architectural style: Late 19th and 20th Century Revivals, Classical Revival
- Part of: Playhouse Square (ID78002041)
- Added to NRHP: October 5, 1978

Kennedy's Cabaret is a theater in downtown Cleveland, Ohio, part of the Playhouse Square. It is located in the basement under the center. It is mostly used for intimate performances as it can only fit about 50 comfortably. The space can be repurposed depending on the production.
