= Crowne Plaza Cleveland at Playhouse Square =

Coordinates: 41°30′01.5″N 81°41′00.1″W

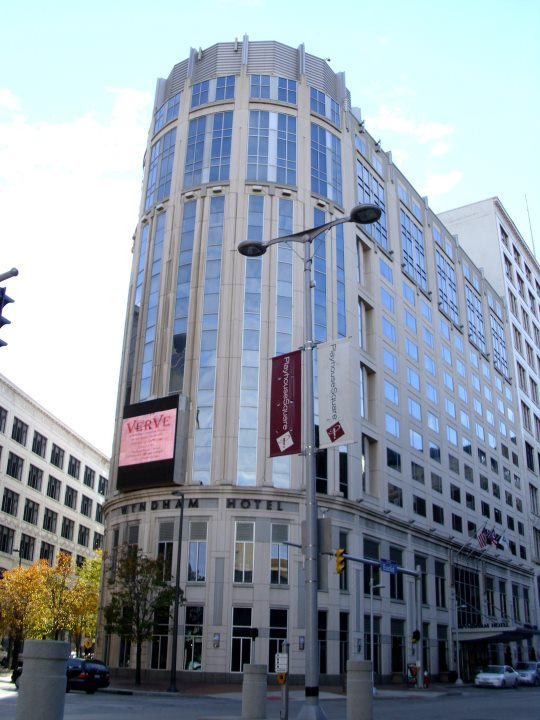
- Crowne Plaza Cleveland at Huron Road and Euclid Avenue
- Interactive map of the Crowne Plaza Cleveland at Playhouse Square area
- Former names: Wyndham Hotel Cleveland; Wyndham Cleveland at Playhouse Square

General information
- Type: Hotel
- Location: 1260 Euclid Avenue, Cleveland, Ohio, U.S.
- Construction started: July 1993
- Completed: July 1995

Height
- Roof: 55.47 m (182 ft)

Technical details
- Floor count: 14

Design and construction
- Architects: RTKL and Herman Galvin Gibans Inc.

Other information
- Number of rooms: 233

The Crowne Plaza Cleveland at Playhouse Square is a mid-sized, 14-story Crowne Plaza hotel in downtown Cleveland's Playhouse Square district, located at the intersection of Huron Road and Euclid Avenue. Originally known as the Wyndham Cleveland at Playhouse Square, the structure helped to complete the revitalization of Playhouse Square. It changed brand names in August 2017.

== Construction ==
The site of the hotel was occupied by the Euclid Point Building (also known more simply as the "Point Building"), which began construction in 1907 at the intersection of Huron Road and Euclid Avenue (1260 Euclid Avenue). The large property between the Euclid Point Building and the future site of the Halle Building was leased in 1909, and became the Winous Building. (Note: These two structures eventually merged into a single building, which continued to be known as the Point Building.)

In 1983, the eastern portion of the Point Building was demolished. Huron Road was redirected to turn north through this portion of the Point Building site, connecting it with E. 13th Street. A new mini-park and plaza was created on the old site of the road.

In the fall of 1987, local developers proposed demolishing the Point Building and constructing a new luxury hotel on the site to serve the reviving Playhouse Square district to the east of the Halle Building. The original design of the hotel depicted a round tower on the east end, with an asymmetrical spire on the south side. Atop the spire was a powerful light, intended to act like a "beacon" drawing people to Playhouse Square. The Point Building was torn down in the fall of 1988 to prepare for this construction, Demolition of the structure left the windowless, blank eastern wall of the Halle Building facing Playhouse Square.

The $27.6 million ($61,500,000 in 2025 dollars) Wyndham Hotel at Playhouse Square broke ground in July 1993. The city of Cleveland and the state of Ohio both made low-interest loans to the developers. The city also contributed money from a federal Urban Development Action Grant, and provided a 14-year property tax abatement. The total amount of public aid came to $16.5 million ($36,800,000 in 2025 dollars). The initial 1987 design had been somewhat revised to make the structure fit in with the nearby Halle Building. The two architectural firms designing the structure, RTKL Associates and Herman Galvin Gibans Inc., eliminated the spire and reduced the height of the tower to bring the hotel's roof in line with that of the Halle Building. The massing of the hotel, its window design and spacing, and its coloring were all changed to mimic that of the Halle Building. (Note: Instead of the terracotta tile used on the exterior of the Halle Building, the Wyndham Hotel was clad in beige concrete panels.)

The completed hotel opened on July 7, 1995. The hotel's ballrooms and meeting rooms were named after famous Cleveland theatres, including the surviving Palace Theater, the long-demolished Roxy, and the Hippodrome (torn down in 1981). The hotel is best described as a post-modern metal-tinged structure. The building and sidewalk around the hotel also has fiber optic lighting in an effort to increase pedestrian safety and enhance foot traffic in the square.

=== Economic impact ===
The development of the Wyndham was a major turning point in both the revitalization of Playhouse Square and the mission of the Playhouse Square Foundation. The hotel helped to stabilize and draw visitors to the re-emerging Playhouse Square, and provided an economic anchor for the entertainment district. The hotel also moved the foundation away from its 25-year-old mission of saving theaters and into real estate development. By providing the Playhouse Square Foundation with more than $2 million a year in revenue, the hotel ensured the foundation's financial viability and allowed it to purchase and renovate other nearby properties.

In 2015, the Wyndham began a year-long upgrade which included renovation of all its guest rooms, the repainting and recarpeting of its public spaces, and the introduction of new furniture in its public areas, meeting rooms, and ballrooms.

== Conversion to Crowne Plaza ==
Beginning about 2010, five new hotels opened in downtown Cleveland near the Wyndham at Playhouse Square. The Playhouse Square Foundation considered selling the structure as the Wyndham's contract to manage the hotel came close to its 1997 expiration date. The foundation decided against a sale in favor of a management change.

On August 24, 2017, the hotel changed its name to the Crowne Plaza Cleveland at Playhouse Square. As part of the change, the hotel underwent a $6 million ($8,000,000 in 2025 dollars) renovation that included refurbishment of all existing guest rooms. Guest rooms now featured faster Internet service, Wi-Fi outlets, multiple access to plug-in Internet service in each room, improved working spaces (such as larger desks), and new, large-screen flat screen 49-inch (120 cm) televisions. The hotel's bar and formal restaurant were merged into a single room featuring a "gastropub" concept.

== See also ==
- Downtown Cleveland
- List of tallest buildings in Cleveland
