= Shepardson =

Shepardson is a surname. Notable people with the surname include:

- John Shepardson (1729—1802), American settler
- Marge Shepardson, American politician
- Ray Shepardson (1897–1975), American baseball player
- Raymond K. Shepardson (1944–2014), American theatre restoration specialist and operator
- Rob Shepardson, American political consultant and marketing strategist
- Whitney Shepardson (1890–1966), American businessman and foreign policy expert
- Gunner Shepardson(2007), American rapper and singer
