= 14th Street Theatre =

Former theatre in Cleveland, Ohio, USA

- Interactive map of 14th Street Theatre
- Address: 2037 E. 14th Street; Cleveland, Ohio; United States
- Coordinates: 41°30′11″N 81°41′02″W
- Owner: Playhouse Square Group
- Capacity: 288

Construction
- Opened: 2002
- Closed: 2013

The 14th Street Theatre, previously located at 2037 E. 14th Street in downtown Cleveland, Ohio, United States, was a 297-seat theater built in 2002 as part of Playhouse Square. Originally built for Second City Cleveland, the theater closed in 2013 and is now Cibreo Privato, the private dining space for the Italian restaurant Cibreo, owned and operated by Driftwood Restaurant Group.

== History ==
The space was originally built in 1921 as part of the Hanna Building. In 2001, a new, more spacious lobby was constructed, designed by Joseph R. Hanna with collaboration from local artists.

The theater was built in May 2002, renovating part of a former Hickerson's restaurant to be used as a comedy club filled by Second City's Cleveland chapter in collaboration with Playhouse Square. The comedy club closed on January 3, 2004. Shortly after, the space, which was in the Hanna Building, was renamed to the 14th Street Theatre. The first musical to use the space after this change was Menopause the Musical, a cabaret that had previously been shown off-Broadway. On January 23, 2004, Playhouse Square officials signed off on the musical, leaving only a short time between the closing of the comedy club and the reopening of the space as a theater.

In 2013, the theater closed and became a 250-seat private dining and event center called Cibreo Privato, owned and operated by Driftwood Restaurant Group. The space was temporarily run by Bricco-Cleveland during the transition period, but ultimately was redesigned to incorporate the theater's original architecture.

== Productions ==
The first production at the 14th Street Theatre was Menopause the Musical, which ran April 16 to August 31, 2005. Other productions included Brooklyn The Musical (May 2008), Simply Romance (July 2011), and Lizzie Borden (March-April 2012).
