= Hanna Building =

Coordinates: 41°30′3″N 81°40′52″W

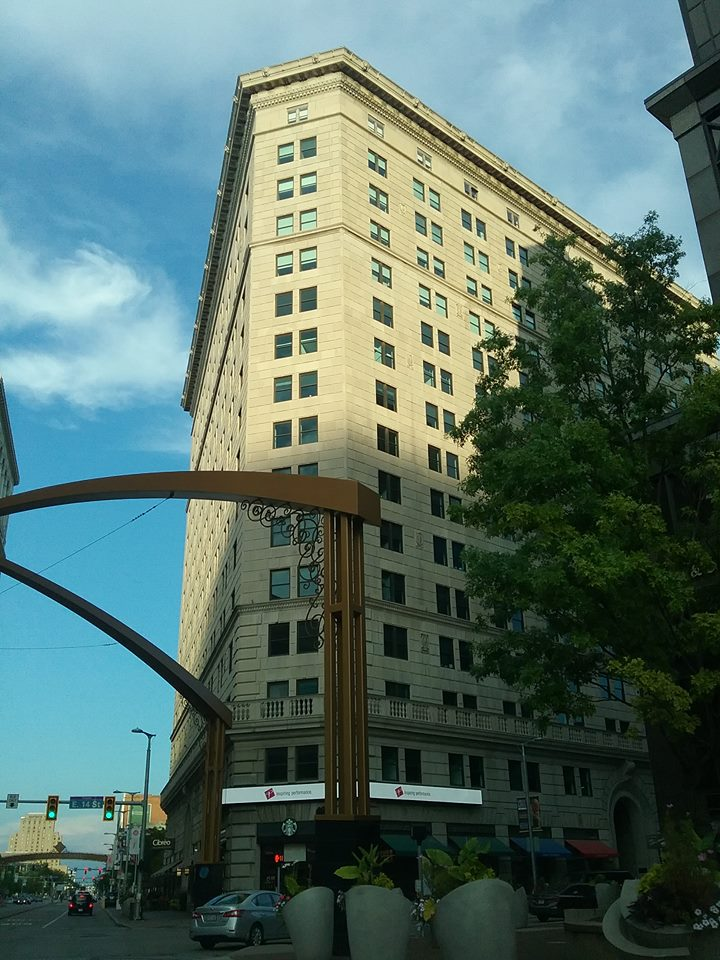
- Interactive map of the Hanna Building area
- Former names: None

General information
- Type: Commercial (The Annex: Residential)
- Location: 1422 Euclid Avenue Cleveland, Ohio 44115 United States
- Construction started: 1920
- Completed: 1921

Height
- Roof: 59.13 m (194 ft)

Technical details
- Floor count: 16

Design and construction
- Architect: Charles Adams Platt

The Hanna Building is a historically renovated high-rise in downtown Cleveland's Theater District on the corner of East 14th Street and Euclid Avenue. The building stands 194 feet high and rises to 16 stories. It was built in 1921 and was added to the National Register of Historic Places in 1978. The Hanna is part of the Playhouse Square historic property portfolio and features many of the same features such as news tickers, billboards, and decorative elements as the other "theatrical" buildings in the locale. The Hanna is highly recognizable on the Playhouse Square and is currently the third tallest building in the Theater District behind the B.F. Keith and the US Bank Centre. Like many buildings of the era, the Hanna sits in an oblong fashion in relation to the street grid and runs parallel to the roadways of Euclid Avenue and East 14th Street, respectfully.

== A Legacy is Born ==
The structure takes its namesake from the turn of the century prominently powerful Ohio senator, political rival of former Cleveland mayor Tom L. Johnson, avid statesman, and Cleveland businessman Mark Hanna. Mark Hanna was known for being extravagant and free with his money, therefore it is little wonder that his family decided to invest in a skyscraper in Cleveland with his name on it, as Hanna died in 1904. Hanna was instrumental in bringing millions in federal funds to the Cleveland area. The Hanna Building remains offices while the Hanna Annex is now apartments currently operated by the firm K & D Group of Willoughby, Ohio, which has extensive property holdings in the Greater Cleveland area.

== The Annex ==
The building also features an annex which houses the much revered home of the regionally lauded troupe Great Lakes Theater Festival, the intimate Playhouse Square owned cabaret styled Hanna Theater. In 2012, the K & D Group announced that they would convert and renovate the Hanna annex to 102 apartments that would come online in 2014. The apartments sit along the prominent Cleveland throughway of Prospect Avenue and look out to the south of Playhouse Square and to the west towards downtown.

== See also ==
- List of tallest buildings in Cleveland
- Downtown Cleveland
