= Connor Palace =

Entertainment venue in Cleveland, Ohio, US

Coordinates: 41°30′4″N 81°40′52″W

- Palace Theatre
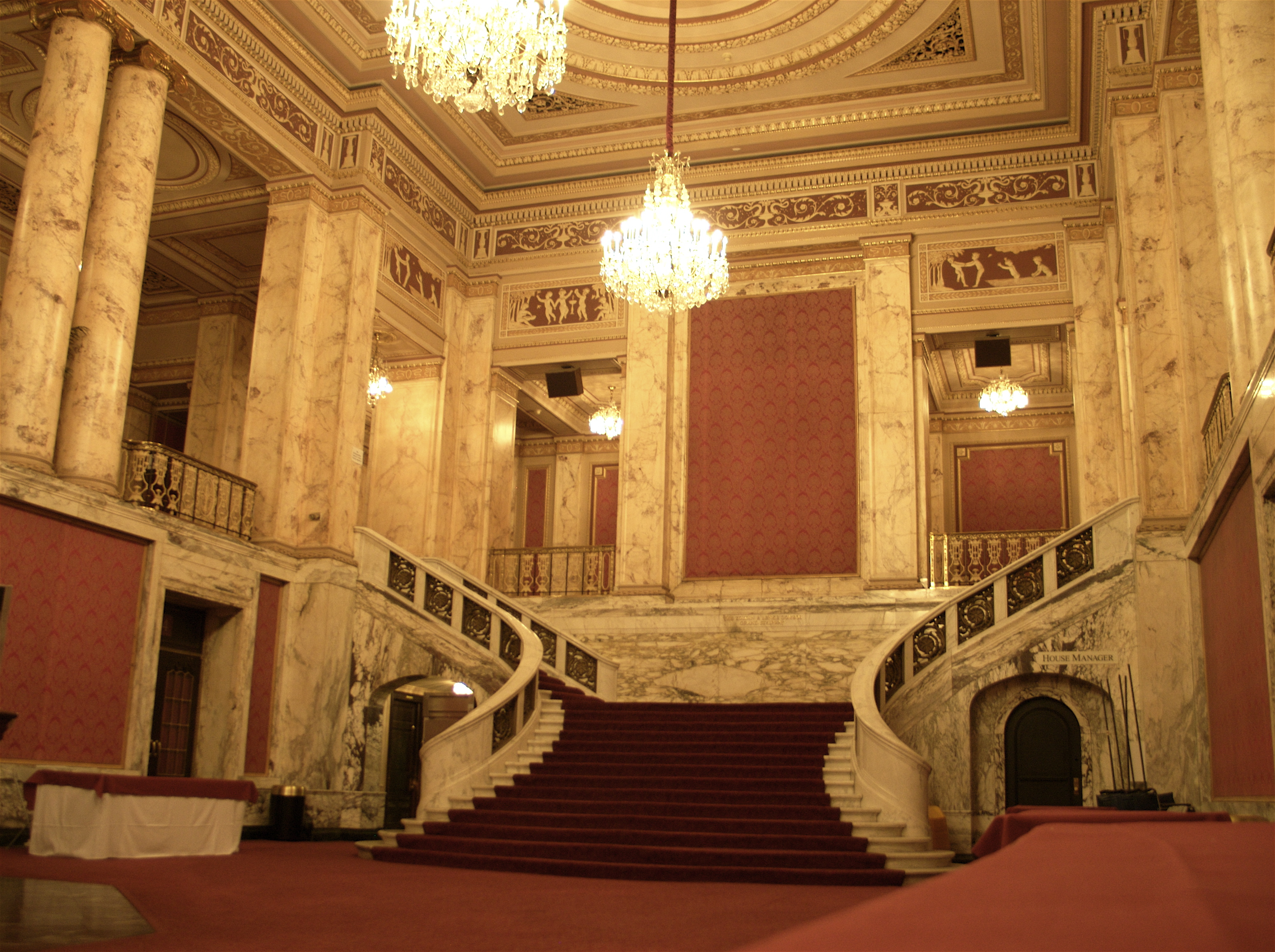
- Interactive map of Connor Palace
- Former names: Palace Theatre (1922–2014)
- Address: 1615 Euclid Avenue; Cleveland, Ohio; United States
- Owner: Playhouse Square Foundation
- Capacity: 2,714
- Type: Vaudeville theatre
- Current use: Performing arts center

Construction
- Opened: 1922
- Rebuilt: 1973
- Architect: Rapp & Rapp

Website
- www.playhousesquare.org
- Connor Palace
- U.S. Historic district – Contributing property
- Location within Ohio Location within the United States
- Part of: Playhouse Square (ID78002041)
- Added to NRHP: October 5, 1978

The Connor Palace, also known as the Palace Theatre and historically as the RKO Palace, is a theater at 1615 Euclid Avenue in Downtown Cleveland, Ohio, part of Playhouse Square.

== Construction ==
Construction on Connor Palace began in the early 1920s and was the last of the four main theaters to be built in Cleveland's historic Playhouse Square. It was also the most expensive at an estimated $2 to 3.5 million. Edward F. Albee built it along with the three other main theaters, the Allen Theatre, Ohio Theatre (renamed the Mimi Ohio Theatre, and State Theater (renamed KeyBank State Theatre). Albee was a vaudeville impresario who founded the Keith-Albee Orpheum vaudeville chain and wanted to make Playhouse Square the flagship of his company.

The theatre was originally named the B. F Keith-Albee Palace Theatre, sometimes known as the B. F. Keith Palace Theatre or just Palace Theatre, in memory of Albee's partner Benjamin F. Keith, who died several years earlier in 1914. Alongside Albee in this endeavor was John Lorange, coined by newspapers as "the Father of Playhouse Square." Lorange and his partners had long since been aware of the expiring leases of many small theaters in the area and began buying up property along Euclid Avenue that would later be known as Playhouse Square. They wanted to revamp the area that had long since deteriorated and make it the center of entertainment in the Midwest.

Once the properties were bought, Albee was added to the project. The project had a mostly positive reception, with many locals excited about the idea of Cleveland becoming an entertainment hub akin to New York City and Broadway. However, some had doubts as Doan's Corner, as it was coined, was considered worthless real estate. A few years earlier, a local real estate tycoon had recommended to his customers that they "have nothing to do with Doan's Corner or you'll drop your bankrolls."

Albee and his partner had faced previous backlash when they embarked on a similar project in Boston. However, Albee ignored the hacklers, and Playhouse Square and Palace Theatre were a resounding success.

The theatre was designed by the Chicago architectural firm of Rapp and Rapp in the French Renaissance Style. The theatre was built with 154 chandlers, most of which have survived and sat 3,100 people. The interior was decorated with over a hundred paintings and various artworks from several famous artists. The main lobby dubbed the Main Hall, served as a gallery of sorts holding an impressive collection of thirty paintings. It held works from European masters such as Corot and Poussin.

A popular picture spot for visitors is the Blue Urn, which still stands near the main entrance today. It was created in Sevres, Italy, pre-World War I, and was picked by Albee personally at a local antique shop. It weighs a total of 325 pounds and is made of porcelain and Numidian marble. The theatre was built within the Keith Building and housed the largest electrical sign in the world on its roof. The modern Playhouse Square sign that overlooks U.S. Bank Plaza is a nod to the original sign.

The theatre had many amenities, which drew in many famous vaudeville performers who were eager to perform in such a state-of-the-art vicinity such as Grace Hayes and The Casinos. The backstage alone housed an indoor golf course, barber shop, manicure table, billiard room, and even a children's playroom. They also had a bronze switchboard with a marble border that was the only one in the world at the time. The theatre's paneling was painted in a deep mulberry shade that would later be affectionately coined "Albee Red" due to Albee's fondness for the color.

Another focal point of the theatre was a marble fireplace at the entrance of the stage, said to have cost $2,000, $32 459.89 in 2024. The stage itself was massive at 59 feet wide, 35 feet at its highest point, and 90 feet deep. There were seven floors of dressing rooms with elevator access to each room, and each room was named after a different state. Each dressing room had a separate room that housed a shower, bathtub, and medicine cabinet. The dressing rooms themselves were said to be lavishly decorated and included a dressing table with automatic lighting adjustments, a full-length mirror, a walk-in closet, and a small kitchen.

The entire theatre was designed with marble and gold accents that gave the theatre an imperial appearance. The marble used for the theatre was from Carrara, Italy, the same marble used in Michelangelo's David. It was said that Albee was so meticulous about the theatre that he went down to the docks where the marble was shipped and doused it in water with a hose. The water exposed any unusual markings or colors, and then Albee handpicked each piece he wanted to be saved for use in the theatre.

The theater also housed one of the largest woven carpets in the world, which ran from one end of the hall up the staircase and down the main lobby. It was made in Czechoslovakia and was hand-woven. The theatre housed many priceless antiques, which served to elevate the theatre's status as a place of high-class entertainment. Just before opening, Albee hired John F. Royal as the manager of Palace Theatre, a controversial choice due to Royal's relatively young age and inexperience. However, Royal had risen through the ranks of Albee's company and proven himself to be an excellent showman. Once construction was complete and Royal was hired, the theatre was ready for its grand opening.

== Opening and beginning years ==
The theatre opened on November 6, 1922, with vaudeville star Elsie Janis headlining. The show was sold out, with several high-profile guests of the entertainment world attending, like Marcus Loew, a pioneer of the motion picture world and founder of Metro-Goldwin-Mayer (MGM) film studio, and Adolph Zukor, one of the three founders of Paramount Pictures. Several vaudeville stars also attended, along with prominent theatre critics like Heywood Broun, a renowned New York journalist. The guest list also included several local theatre VIPs, politicians, and journalists from newspapers all across the Midwest.

The Grand Opening was a success, and critics claimed Palace Theatre as "the finest theatre in the world" and "the crowning achievement of Playhouse Square." From 1922 to 1926, the theatre earned unparalleled success, hosting live two-a-day vaudeville shows. They hosted the likes of Fanny Brice, Mae West, and Fred Astaire. In 1923, a production called "The Unknown Lady," starring Alla Nazimova, was removed from the bill after a local minister petitioned the theatre due to inappropriate content. In 1926, the Goodrich Silvertown Orchestra, directed by critically acclaimed Joseph Knecht, performed for three nights in November. The famous Silver Masked Tenor was featured in the performance. A twentieth-century phantom of the opera, his true identity remained a mystery to the public for several years until he was later revealed to be a man named Joseph M. White. He had gained such popularity through various radio shows that when he performed on the Keith-Albee Vaudeville circuit, he had to be personally escorted to and from the theatre by police.

George Burns and Gracie Allen were married on the stage of the Palace Theatre by a justice of the peace in 1926. Several minstrel shows were also performed at the theatre between 1922 and 1928 and were extremely popular among the primarily white crowd. Ironically, the Palace also hosted several African American entertainers who performed around the same time, including the comedy group Williams and Walker Co., known for using comedy to subvert harmful racial stereotypes.

== The rise of motion pictures ==
Despite the Palace Theatre being built for Vaudeville acts and even though they sold 1.7 million tickets in their first year alone, the increasing interest in radio and motion pictures caused a major decline in public interest in live performances. In 1925, James Weed, a manager at the theatre, gave in to public demand and installed a movie screen.

The first film to be shown was a silent film on the building of the Trans-Continental Railroad by John Ford called "The Iron Horse." The tickets cost 25 cents. The first talking movie to be shown in Ohio was played at the Palace Theatre in 1926 after the installation of speakers.

In the summer of 1926, motion picture films were added to the Palace's much-awaited Summer program. The first film to be shown was "The Volga Boatman," a silent film starring William Boyd, a silent film actor from Hendrysburg, Ohio, and Elinor Fair. Vaudeville remained a staple at the Palace Theatre with performances of the likes of Frank Sinatra, Bob Hope, and Bing Crosby, but the film became the primary draw.

In December 1928 the Akron Motion Picture Theatre Owners' Association offered membership to local theaters showing both vaudeville and film, including the Palace Theatre. In January 1929 the first technicolor film was shown, depicting several famous movie stars modeling the newest fashions. In the 1930s, the theater was renamed RKO Theater. RKO theatres showed several films, but they often showed films starring William Boyd. Several talking movies were shown at the theatre in 1930, including "The Life of the Party," a technicolor comedy film made by the Warner Brothers before the establishment of the Motion Picture Censorship Code.

In 1933, prohibition in America ended, and Ohio became one of the first three states to legalize the buying and selling of alcohol. In response, the theater installed two new bars and began selling alcohol during performances.

In 1937, a former mail carrier for "The Plain Dealer" had just made his fourth performance at the theatre when the manager encouraged him to try his comedy sketch in Hollywood. The young man confessed he did not have money for a train ticket, but the manager believed so greatly in his talent that he paid the fare for him. The kid would later go on to become a famous comedian Red Skelton.

== The end of Vaudeville and Palace Theatre ==
Vaudeville continued to decline as the Great Depression created a need for cheaper entertainment. The theatre began removing more and more live acts from their program and replacing them with films that were cheaper to make and produce. In the 1950s, Vaudeville was completely dead, and the theatre quit performing live acts altogether.

An innovation in 1952 revolutionized motion pictures called Cinerama. It created movie screens three times larger than ever before. In 1956, RKO management decided to install Cinerama screens in the theatre to mark the new era of entertainment. The new screens required three projectors and a new updated sound system. The sheer size of the renovation led the theater to remove 1,800 seats to make space. The new system was unveiled on November 14, 1956, and there were lines leading all the wait out of the theatre. However, the success was short-lived, and ticket sales saw a rapid decline in the late 50s and 60s.

Post-World War II saw the rapid migration of people to the suburbs, and that, along with the mass production of television sets, meant fewer and fewer people were looking to the theatre district for entertainment. By March 1969, Playhouse Square had completely deteriorated, with Hanna and Palace Theatre being the only theaters still open. Newspapers had been predicting the theatre's closing for several months, and many articles were released reminiscing on the glory days of vaudeville and live theatre. Newspapers even interviewed old employers who had worked at the theatre during its golden age.

The Palace Theatre would meet its eventual end on July 30, 1969. The air conditioning broke during the showing of "Krakatoa, East of Java," putting an end to the overall disaster of the show. The theatre closed for the day for repairs and never reopened. The closing of this historic theatre was overshadowed when news hit the same day that Buzz Aldrin and Neil Armstrong had successfully landed on the moon.

== Revival ==
Palace Theatre lay empty for a couple of years, and it seemed like the once great entertainment hub that had helped launch the careers of many of the greatest performers of the twentieth century would be left to collect dust. Then, on May 25, 1972, "The Plain Dealer" released an article saying the theaters were scheduled to be demolished by the city to make space for a parking lot. However, a local preservation group had formed in the late 60s called the "Playhouse Square Association," which was eager to prevent this development.

Spearheaded by Ray Sheperdson, they met with the sole goal of renovating the four primary theaters, including Palace Theatre, in hopes of re-establishing Cleveland's theatre district. In 1970, they had earned their non-profit status and had begun raising money for their project, but it was not enough. A local lawyer named Oliver "Pudge" Henkle persuaded city officials to temporarily deny a permit for a curb cut on Euclid Avenue, giving the group more time to save the theaters.

Several groups in the Cleveland area helped the Playhouse Square Association, including "The Junior League of Cleveland" run by then-president Elaine Hadden. They earned $25,000 in seed money for the cause. In 1973, Sheperdson and his group had earned enough money to buy a temporary lease for the Palace Theatre and began holding Cabaret performances in the partially reopened theater to raise money.

In 1976, the Playhouse Square Association merged with Playhouse Square Operating Co., creating the Playhouse Square Foundation. They then hired architect Van Dijik to help with renovations. He comes up with the idea of unifying all four theaters by connecting the lobbies to create one giant theater complex.

In 1977, the group obtained the permanent leases of three of the four main theaters, including the Palace Theatre, bringing all under the same management for the first time in their history. Finally, in October 1978, Playhouse Square was added to the National Registry of Historic Places, protecting it from destruction in the future. The saving of Palace Theatre and Playhouse Square is considered one of Cleveland's Top Ten Achievements by civic leaders.

== Reopening ==
April 30, 1988, Palace Theatre doors were reopened to the public after a 34.5 million dollar renovation. Many restorations were made, but The Playhouse Square Foundation worked tirelessly to keep the theatre as close to its original design as possible. However, years of vandalism and neglect had destroyed much of the original building. They removed the 1950s Cinema Screen, replacing it with a larger, more modern model. They also added a three manual 13 Rank Organ that was originally housed at Liberty Theater in Pittsburgh, Pennsylvania. The "world's largest woven rug" was replaced with wall-to-wall carpeting in the main lobby. Also, many of the original antiques and chandeliers had been sold or stolen, including the $500,000 lobby art collection, but thankfully the original Palace Czechoslovak crystal chandeliers remained.

The theater underwent its third name change from RKO Theatre to Palace Theatre during its ten-year restoration. After its restoration, the Palace Theatre was the second-largest theatre in Playhouse Square.

Tickets to the grand reopening varied from $1000 to $65, though the high price did not prevent them from selling out. The grand reopening was so highly anticipated that they held a fundraiser called "Cooking at the Palace," which included restaurants from all fifty states to see who would provide the food for the event.

The grand opening started at 6 pm complete with a ribbon cutting and ceremonial candle lighting. Dinner and drinks were served as well; guests were serenaded by a complete orchestra. Then a gala was headlined by Burt Bacharach and Dionne Warwick, the famous director and pop icon pair who had split professionally in the late 70s but were brought back together by the reopening of Palace Theatre. The gala was supposed to be held on the Palace Theatre stage, but with 1,500 expected guests, they had to move the event to the larger State Theatre stage.

The grand reopening also served as a first look for the public at the planned designs for Playhouse Square Hotel, known as Crowne Plaza Cleveland at Playhouse Square. The day after the reopening, the theater held a free open house for anyone who wished to tour the newly renovated building. The theater had been returned to its former glory, complete with a star-studded cast of performers, including Cher, Whoopi Goldberg, and Wayne Newton.

== Connor Theatre ==
Palace Theatre continued to thrive in the late 1980s and early 1990s. Alongside the three other major theatres, it is part of the largest theatre complex outside of New York. In the late 1980s, it further abandoned its strict vaudeville beginnings by including a wide variety of entertainment. This included an incredibly popular speaker series that included the likes of film star Gregory Peck, opera singer Beverly Sills, then First lady Barbra Bush, and State General Colin Powell.

The theatre also continued to draw traditional entertainment, such as major post-broadway productions. On the theatre's 80th birthday, Playhouse Square called on a local bakery to recreate a three-tiered anniversary cake that had been ceremonially cut by actor Danny Kane on the theater's 25th anniversary in 1947.

The theater continued to evolve, developing an Education Department in 2001 that helped fund local school trips to the theater. On its 93rd, it was renamed for the fourth and final time to Connor Palace Theatre. This was in honor of the Connor Family of Huntington Valley, Ohio, who donated 9 million dollars to the "Advance the Legacy: The Campaign for Playhouse Square." Along with the $9 million given by the Connor family, the fundraiser earned 35 million dollars, the largest philanthropic movement the organization has ever put on.

The money went to much-needed renovations to the theater's plumbing and electrical system and new productions. The Connor family wrote along with their generous donation, "With this gift, the Connor family applauds the excellent work of the Playhouse Square leadership team in preserving these beautiful theaters as well as the revitalization efforts for their entire downtown neighborhood." The theater went through one final renovation in 2020 during the COVID-19 pandemic.
