= Allen Theatre =

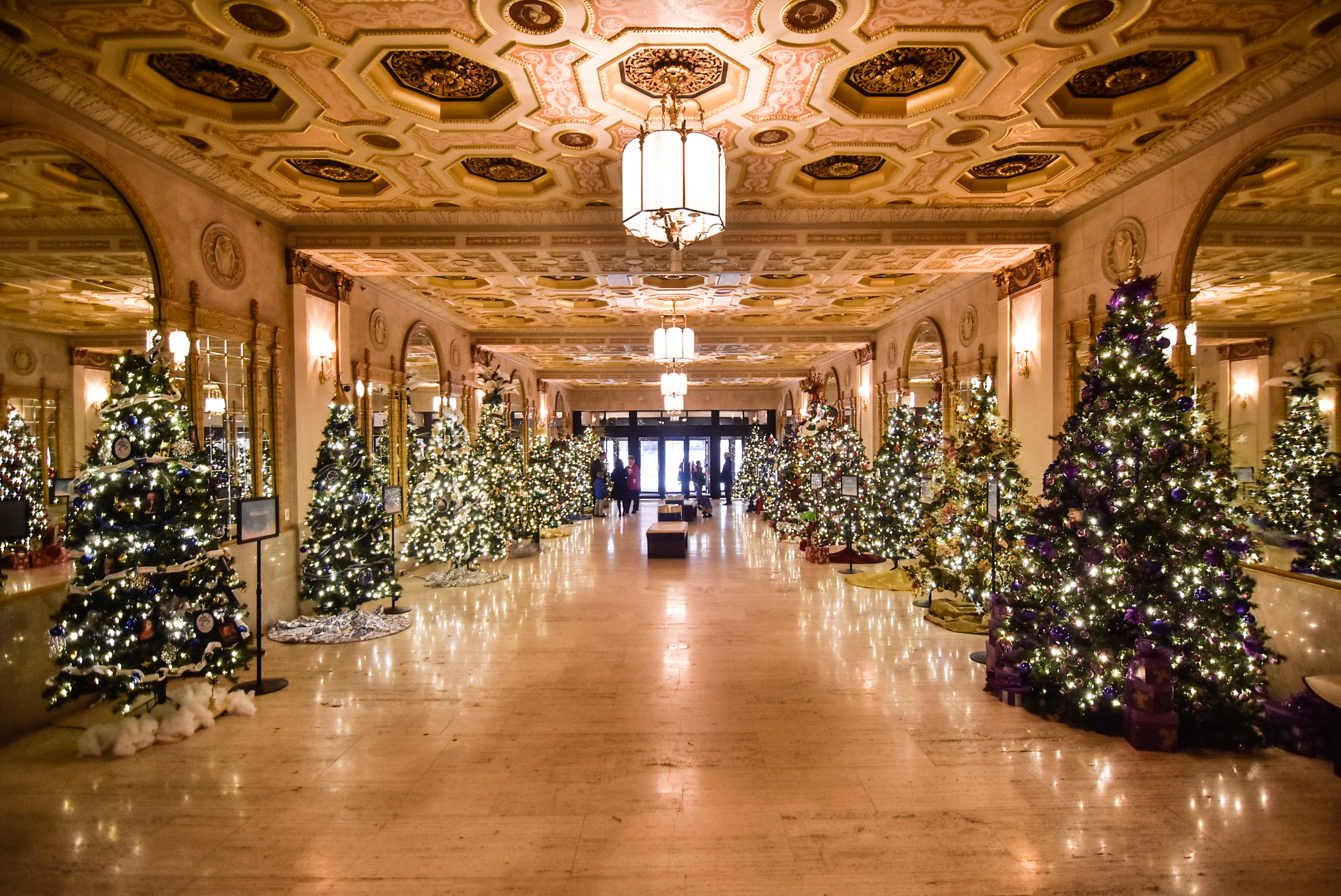
- Lobby of the Allen Theatre
- Interactive map of Allen Theatre
- Address: 1407 Euclid Avenue; Cleveland, Ohio; United States
- Coordinates: 41.501117°N 81.681426°W
- Owner: Playhouse Square Foundation
- Capacity: 500
- Type: Main Stage
- Current use: Performing arts center

Construction
- Opened: 1921
- Rebuilt: 1997, 2011
- Architect: C. Howard Crane

Tenants
- Cleveland Play House, Cleveland State University Department of Theatre and Dance

Website
- www.clevelandplayhouse.com

The Allen Theatre is one of the theaters in Playhouse Square, the performing arts center on Euclid Avenue in downtown Cleveland, Ohio. It was originally designed as a silent movie theater by C. Howard Crane and opened its doors on April 1, 1921, with a capacity of more than 3,000 seats. The first show was of the motion picture Her Greatest Love with Theda Bara, and featured Phil Spitalny and his 35 piece orchestra as live performers. The theater was designed in the Italian Renaissance style and was one of the few "daylight atmospheric" theaters in the country, with a ceiling painted to resemble the open daylight sky. In the lobby, a rotunda was built to resemble the Villa Madama in Rome. The ceiling of the rotunda was decorated with Renaissance-style figures from an unknown artist's imagination which greeted cinema patrons for decades.

By the mid-1960s, financial troubles plagued both the Allen and the other downtown theaters. These were primarily caused by the popularity of television and the growing desire for local residents to move away from the city and into the suburbs. On May 7, 1968, the Allen Theatre was closed. The Allen Theatre hosted a Laserium in the late 1970s. The Playhouse Square Association, formed in 1970, agreed to purchase the Allen in 1993. Fully restored to its former glory, the Allen Theatre reopened on October 3, 1998, with 2,500 seats and became an important venue for hosting touring Broadway musicals and concerts.

In 2000, the Cleveland Ballet, which had been performing in the State Theatre, left the city and moved to San Jose, California. This enabled the State Theatre to produce more Broadway shows; but bookings for the Allen Theatre declined. Playhouse Square began to pursue alternative uses for the Allen Theatre, and eventually found it with two nearby organizations: Cleveland Play House and Cleveland State University.

Through a collaboration called "The Power of Three," Cleveland Play House, Cleveland State University and Playhouse Square partnered and launched a $32 million renovation project to create the Allen Theatre Complex. The theater itself was closed in 2010, underwent a major transformation, and re-opened on September 16, 2011. The house was reduced from seating 2,500 people to just under 500, creating a much more intimate theatrical setting. Large golden panels were installed along the walls of the theater to improve acoustics; in such a way that they could be taken down again, if desired, to reveal the original artwork still decorating the theater. In addition, two new theater spaces were built as a result of the collaboration. The Outcalt Theatre (originally Second Stage) was constructed as a flexible performance space with multiple configuration possibilities and maximum seating of around 300. The Helen Rosenfeld Lewis Bialosky Lab Theatre, seating approximately 100 people, was also built as a black box theater to house the Case Western Reserve University/Cleveland Play House MFA Acting Program and other events throughout the year.

== See also ==
- Playhouse Square
- Cleveland Play House
- Cleveland State University
