= Hanna Theatre =

Theater in Cleveland, Ohio, United States

Coordinates: 41°30′1″N 81°40′52″W

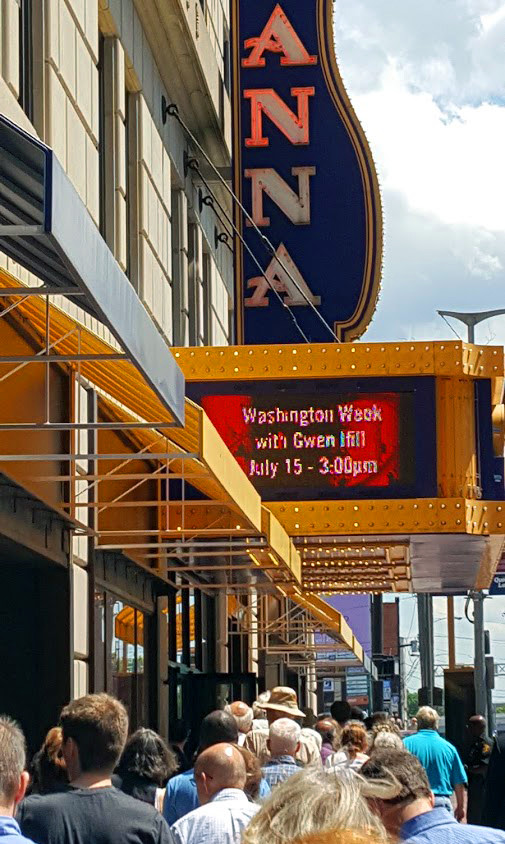
- Interactive map of Hanna Theatre
- Address: East 14th Street; Cleveland, Ohio; United States
- Owner: PlayhouseSquare
- Capacity: 550
- Current use: Performing arts center

Construction
- Opened: 1921
- Closed: 1988
- Rebuilt: 2008
- Architect: Charles A. Platt

The Hanna Theatre is a theater at Playhouse Square in downtown Cleveland, Ohio, United States. It is one of the original five venues built in the district, opening on March 28, 1921. The Hanna Theatre reopened in 2008 as the new home of Great Lakes Theater Festival after a major renovation by the classic theater company.

== Original structure ==
The Hanna Theatre was envisioned by industrialist and publisher Daniel Rhodes Hanna as part of a larger complex in memorial to his father, late U.S. Senator Mark A. Hanna, and was designed by architect Charles A. Platt. Faustinno Sampietro was responsible for most of the interior decorations, which included green and gold carpets, dark green seats, frescoed walls, a fireplace, and Louis XVI gilt furniture; the ceiling was coffered and was made up of circular and octagonal medallions, each of which contained gilded classical figures (including Cupid, Psyche, and Pegasus). The orchestra level consisted of 827 seats arranged in 24 rows, and the upper deck held 570 seats. Four rows in the mezzanine, ten rows in the upper balcony, and the box seats brought the theatre's full capacity to 1,421. The stage was forty feet in width and forty feet in depth, equipped with a thirty-six foot proscenium arch. Some idiosyncrasies exist in the layout: Dan Hanna insisted he wanted more room in between the fourth and fifth rows when he tested out a seat he meant to reserve for himself, and as a result there remained thirty-five inches in between these two rows instead of the standard thirty-one inches.

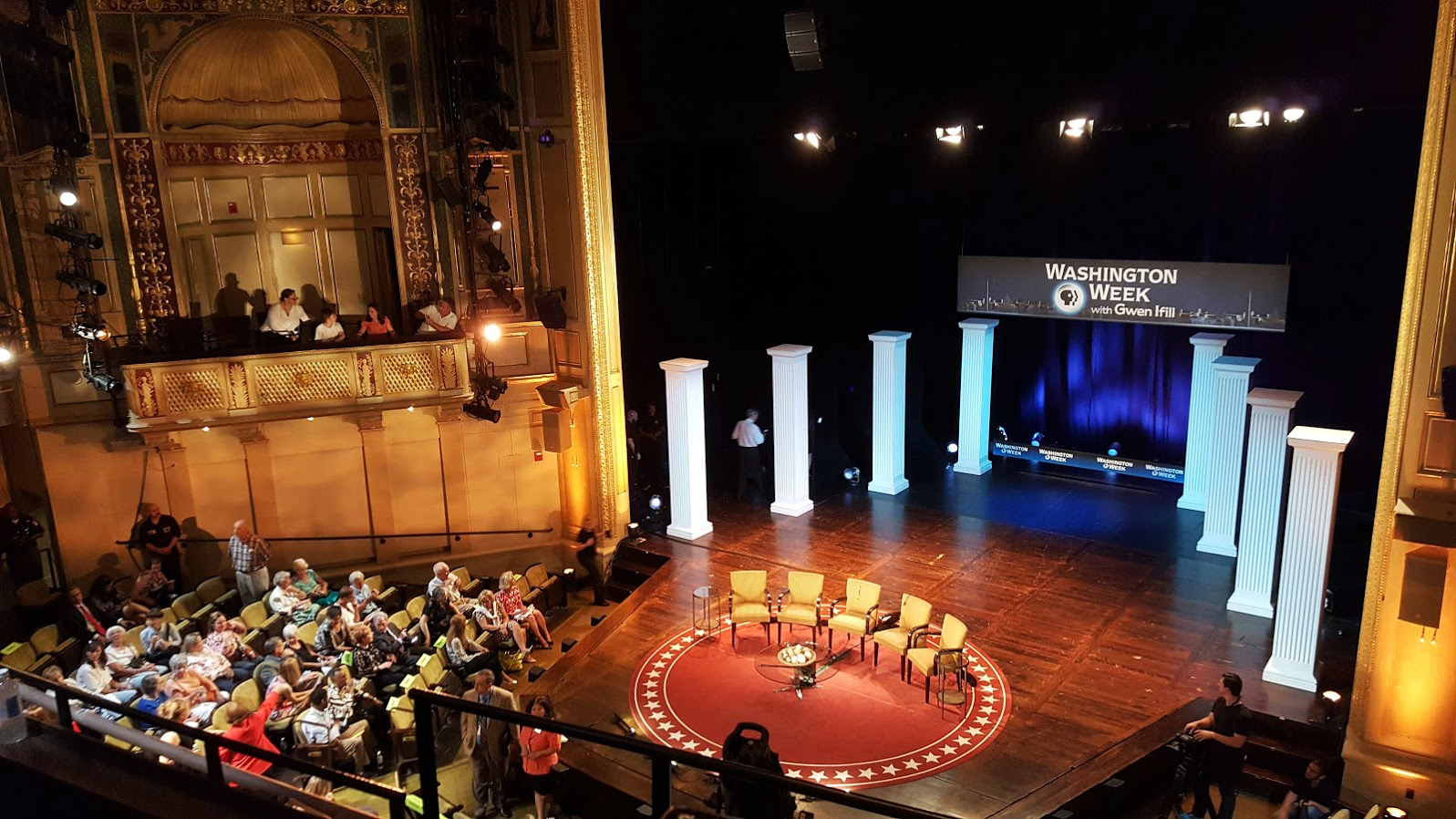
Theatre hosting the taping of Washington Week during the 2016 Republican National Convention in Cleveland

== Opening ==
On March 28, 1921, 1,500 people ventured out into the freezing cold temperatures to witness the new theatre's first production, William Faversham's adaptation of The Prince and the Pauper by Mark Twain. The lobby measured a little over twenty feet in each direction and was nothing in the way of spectacle compared to the State and Ohio Theatres, both of which had opened the previous month. At exactly 8:15 Cleveland orchestra director Max Faetkenheuer opened the show with the "Star-Spangled Banner" and the play began. During intermission, playwright Faversham gave an impromptu speech at the request of the theatre patrons.

=== Hanna Theatre's first season ===
The following is a list of productions that ran at the Hanna Theatre beginning in the spring of 1921:

- The Prince and the Pauper adaptation by William Faversham
- The Passing Show of 1919 by the Shubert Brothers
- Smilin' Through by Allan Langdon Martin
- Jim Jam by the Shubert Brothers
- Pitter Patter by the Shubert Brothers
- The Masquerader by John Hunter Booth
- Midnight Rounders by the Shubert Brothers
- Up in the Haymow by James Avery Hopwood
- Fools Errant by Louis Evan Shipman

The most expensive seats cost three dollars.

== Theatre rivalry ==
Program cover from a 1936 show at the theatre

When Dan R. Hanna died three months into the Hanna Theatre's first full season, the Shubert brothers (Sam, Lee, and J.J. Shubert) remained as lessees under the management of John S. Hale. Around the corner, the brother's biggest rival, Abraham Lincoln Erlanger, continued to lease the Hanna's largest competition, the Ohio Theatre. Under the management of Robert H. McLaughlin, a former newspaperman and press agent, the Ohio Theatre had already built a distinguished repertoire of high class theatre. The Hanna Theatre could not always stand up to such an impressive lineup (including plays such as The Merry Wives of Windsor, Lady, Be Good, and Strange Interlude) and often suffered for it.

== Ray Shepardson's vision ==
The Hanna Theatre closed in 1989, and soon after, Ray Shepardson left his job in the Cleveland public school system to launch a campaign to prevent the closed theater of Playhouse Square from being destroyed. His new vision for the Hanna was based on the concept of a cabaret theatre, which proved successful enough to generate funding by the Junior League and the Cleveland Foundation. By 1993 Ray Shepardson was nationally recognized as a theatre restoration expert, although he was not able to revive interest in the Hanna. The $38 million restoration drive he led mainly helped the larger Playhouse Square theatres, such as the State Theatre, thrive. For the brief time the Hanna did run as a cabaret theater, the interior was refurbished to meet the new needs. Tables and chairs replaced the usual theatre rows, although Shepardson insisted on preserving the theater's original, ornate décor.

== Restoration ==
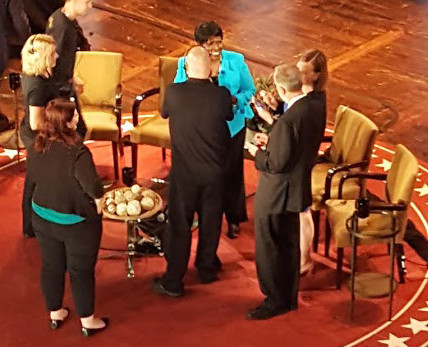
Gwen Ifill after filming an episode of Washington Week at the Hanna Theatre during the 2016 Republican National Convention

The Hanna Theatre was fully restored and reopened in 2008 with the following changes:

1. Six styles of seating: regular house seating, private box, banquette, club, lounge, and bar; reduction to 550 person capacity
2. Multiple ticket-price points for each performance ($20 for lounge area and up to $60 for premium seats)
3. A three-part hydraulic thrust stage that can lower to create a traditional proscenium stage with a full orchestra pit
4. A computer controlled mechanical fly system structurally independent of the building to handle more weight, intended to raise and lower scenery
5. Renovated street-level entrance with a door from the balcony level to an elevator lobby in the Hanna Annex building to allow patrons covered access to a parking garage, and balcony access for disabled patrons
6. Registration with the U.S. Green Building Council's Leadership in Energy and Environmental Design Green Building Rating System, in pursuit of a Silver rating, the third-highest rank

The $14.7 million renovation was meant to rejuvenate the house space and create a comfortable atmosphere for theatre patrons. The Hanna Theatre was the last Playhouse Square theater renovated, a process that began in 1981. Great Lakes Theater producing artistic director Charles Fee and director Bob Taylor were behind the designs for the new theater. The renovated Hanna Theatre opened on September 20, 2008.
