= Playhouse Square =

- U.S. National Register of Historic Places
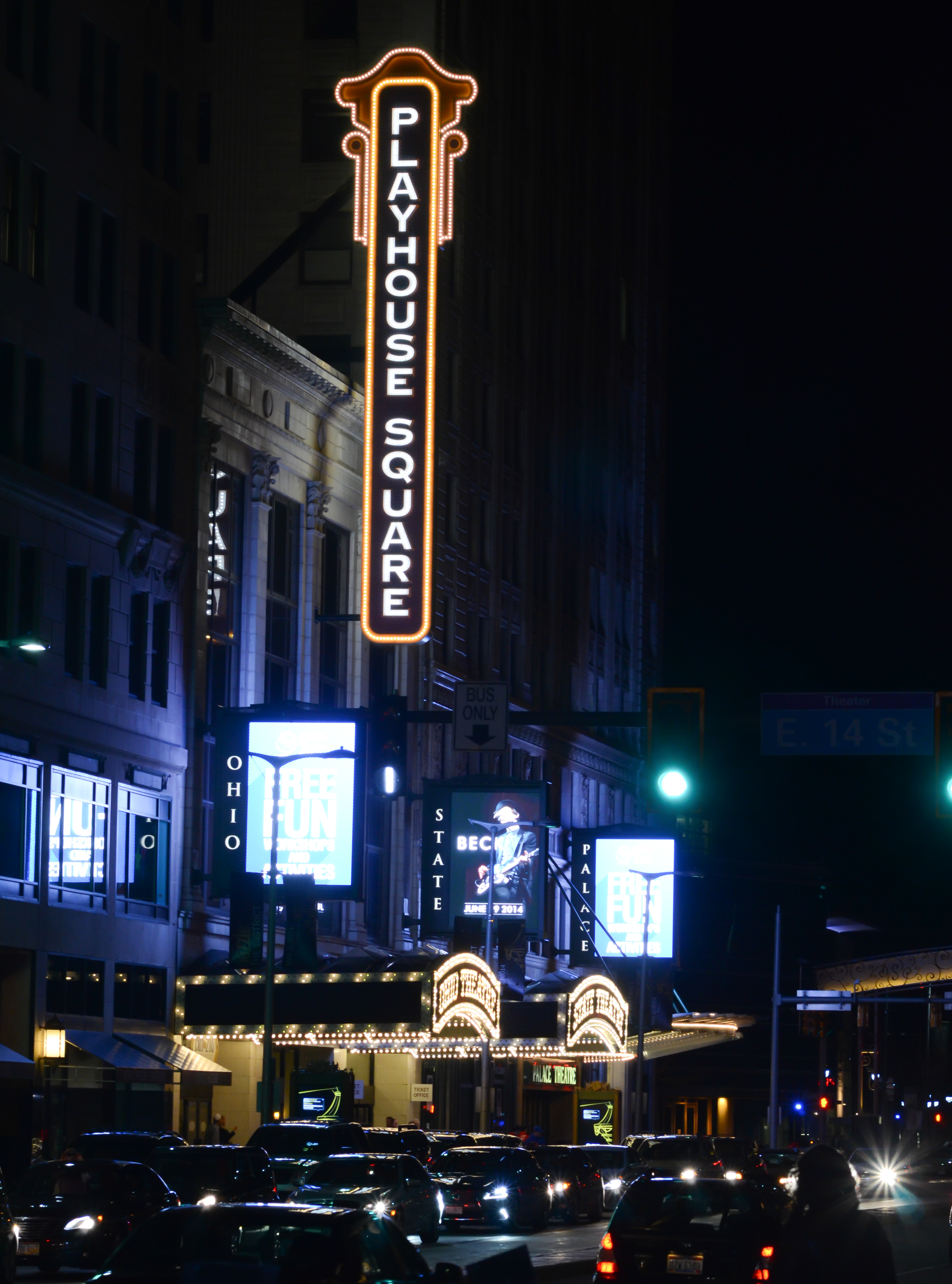
- The Ohio and State Theatres and Connor Palace are on the north side of Euclid Avenue.

- Location within Cleveland Location within Ohio Location within the United States
- Location: 2067 E. 14th St.; 1422, 1501, 1515, 1621 Euclid Ave., Cleveland, Ohio
- Coordinates: 41°30′3″N 81°40′51″W
- Built: 1921
- Architect: Rapp and Rapp
- Architectural style: Late 19th and 20th Century Revivals, Classical Revival, Other
- NRHP reference No.: 78002041
- Added to NRHP: October 5, 1978

Playhouse Square is a theater district in downtown Cleveland, Ohio, United States. It is the largest performing arts center in the US outside of New York City (only Lincoln Center is larger). Constructed in a span of 19 months in the early 1920s, the theaters became a major entertainment hub for the city for much of the 20th century. However, by the late 1960s, the district had fallen into decline and its theaters had closed down. In the 1970s, the district was revived through a grassroots effort that helped usher in a new era of downtown revitalization. For this reason, the revival of Playhouse Square is often locally referred to as being "one of the top ten successes in Cleveland history."

== History ==
=== Construction ===
Following World War I, local developer Joseph Laronge, who had previously opened the Stillman movie house on East 12th street, envisioned a row of theaters on Euclid Avenue between East 14th and East 17th streets. Laronge and New York City business magnate Marcus Loew, among others, founded a partnership called Loew's Ohio Theatres to develop the area.

The organization's first two theaters, the Ohio and State (now known as the KeyBank State), were designed by eminent architect Thomas W. Lamb in the Italianate style. It was considered essential for the theaters' marquees to face Euclid Avenue, but because of space constraints the State Theatre was built at the back of the lot, although its lobby shares the Euclid frontage with the Ohio Theatre. Construction began in 1920, and the pair opened in early February 1921.

Across Euclid Avenue, Charles A. Platt's Hanna Theatre, part of the Hanna Building complex, opened in late March 1921. Although the theater faces East 14th Street, it is still part of Playhouse Square. It was named for the prominent Cleveland Senator Mark Hanna.

Meanwhile, the Bulkley Building housing the C. Howard Crane-designed Allen Theatre was being built next door. Completed in early April 1921, Jules and Jay Allen's Pompeiian-style theater was sold to Loew's in 1922.

The last theater to be constructed was the Palace Theatre, now known as the Connor Palace, opening in November 1922 in the Keith Building, which at the time was the tallest in Cleveland. There was a great promotion for the theater's opening: the largest electric sign in the world was turned on to show that the Palace was open for business. Built by Edward F. Albee in honor of his friend and business partner, B.F.Keith, the Palace was billed as the “Showplace of the World.” Headlining the opener was America's favorite mimic, Elsie Janis, who shared billing with Eduardo Cansino, Rita Hayworth's father. Albee invested over $2 million in the vaudeville venue, which became known as the “…swankiest theater in the country.”

Designed by the Chicago architectural firm of Rapp and Rapp, the Palace was a regional flagship of the Keith-Albee chain of vaudeville theaters.

The area surrounding the theaters soon became known unofficially as “Playhouse Square.” The Euclid Square Association, a civic group, tried to rename the district “Euclid Square,” although these efforts were ultimately unsuccessful. The area is now officially designated as "Playhouse Square."

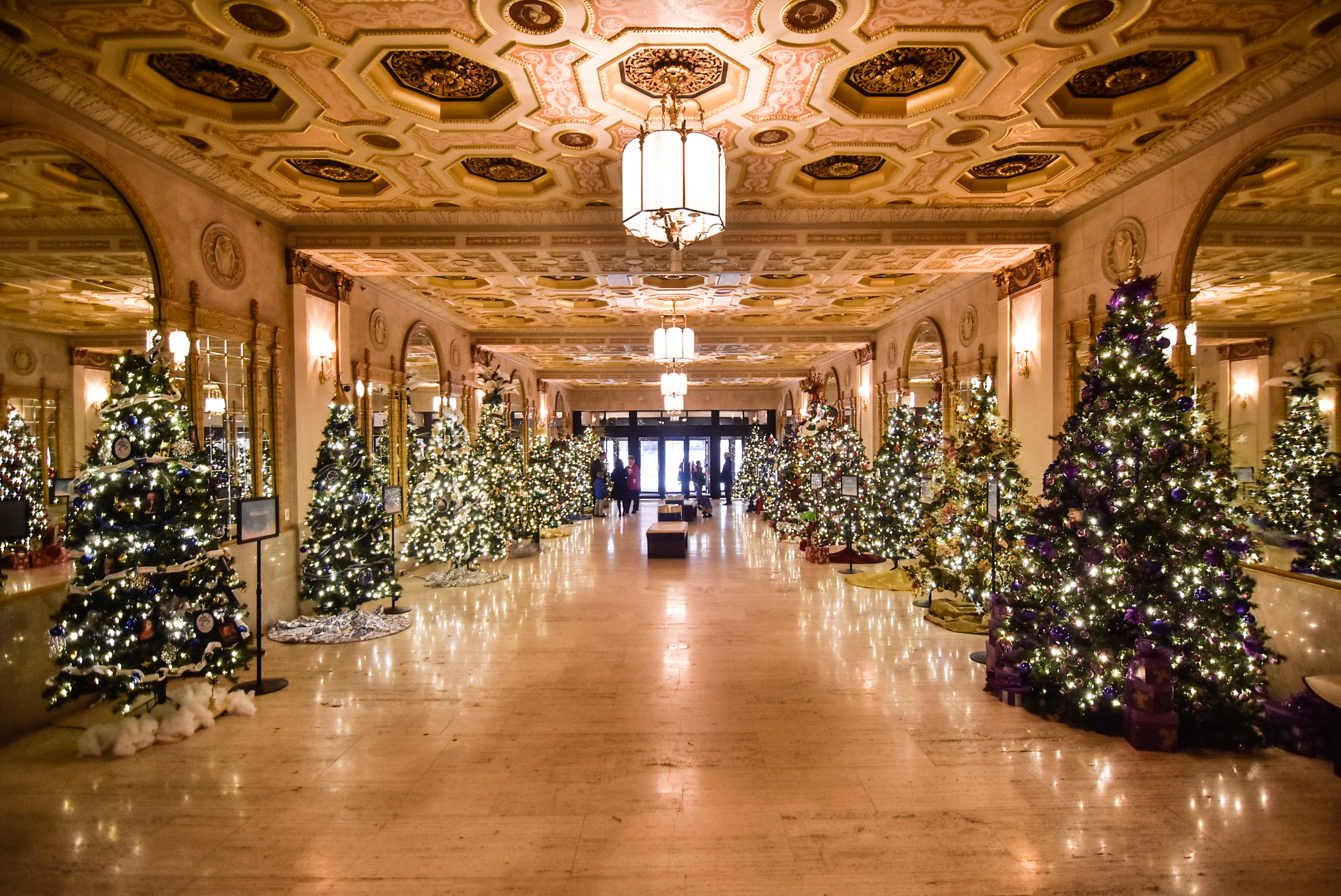
Lobby of the Allen Theatre at Christmas time.

=== Closing and rebirth ===
The theaters successfully showed a variety of serious theater, vaudeville shows, and movies for more than forty years. However, during the years following World War II, suburbanization and the rise of television led to the decline of the theaters. Fire broke out in the Ohio in 1964, and the other Playhouse Square theaters were struck by vandalism. Between May 1968 and July 1969, all the theaters closed except the Hanna.

Plans to reopen and restore the theaters began almost immediately. In 1970, Raymond K. Shepardson, a Cleveland Public Schools employee, formed a non-profit group named the “Playhouse Square Association” with the Junior League of Cleveland, Inc. The cover of the February 27, 1970 issue of Life was a two-page pull-out of James H. Daugherty's The Spirit of Cinema America, a mural in the State Theatre's lobby.

Plans to raze the Ohio and the State Theatres in 1972 and 1977 caused a public outcry, and in 1973 the newly formed Playhouse Square Foundation obtained long-term leases for the Palace, Ohio and State Theatres, while Cuyahoga County commissioners purchased the Loews Building. Also in 1973, the musical revue Jacques Brel is Alive and Well and Living in Paris opened in the State Theatre lobby. Expected to run two weeks, the show instead played for two and a half years. In 1978, Playhouse Square was added to the National Register of Historic Places.

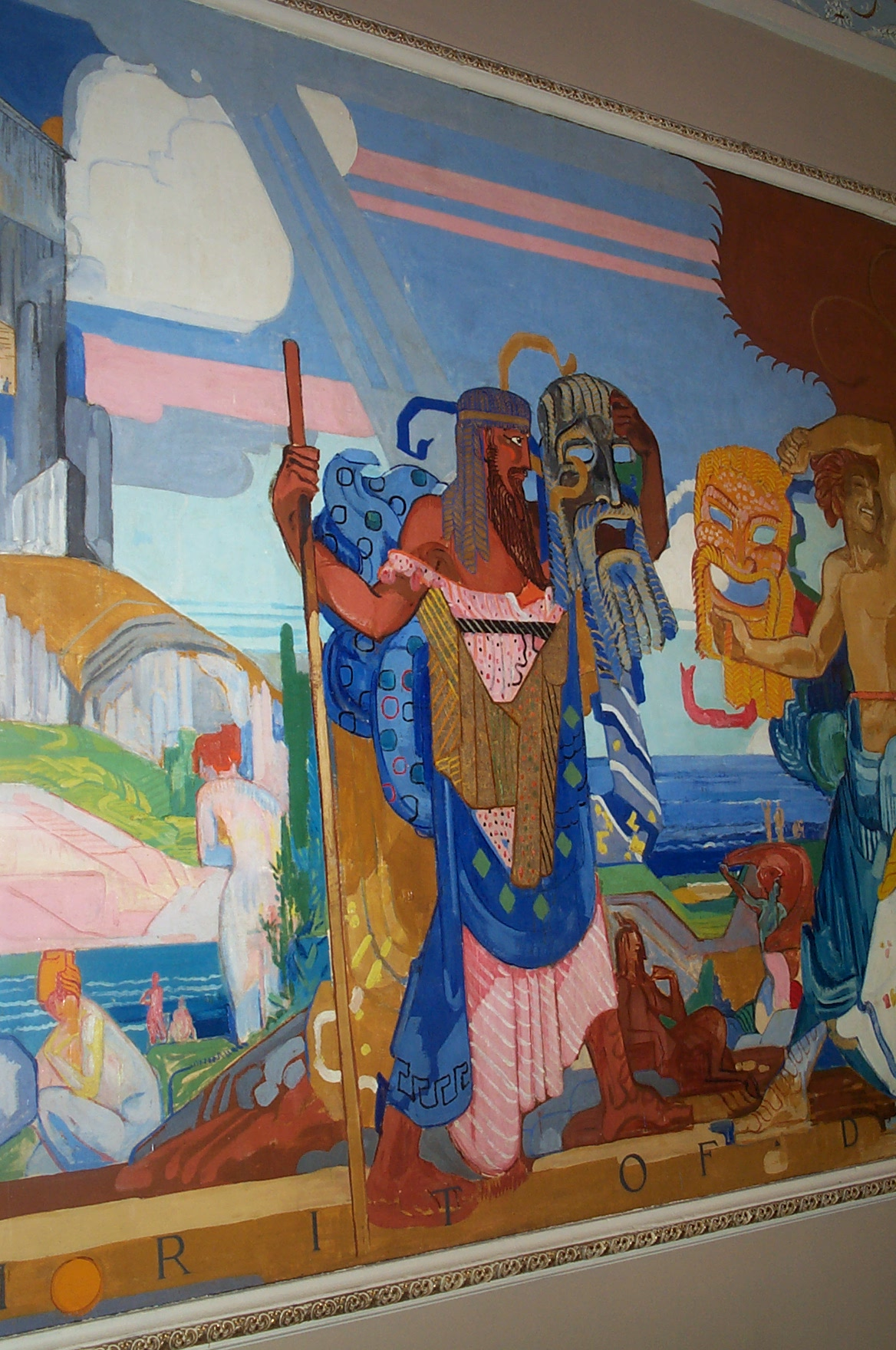
Part of James Daugherty's The Spirit of Drama – Europe, one of four murals in the lobby of the State Theater.

=== Renovation ===
Emboldened by the unprecedented success of Jacques Brel, restoration of the theaters began in earnest. Various public-private partnerships collected some $40 million for the project.

Because of extensive fire damage, the Ohio Theatre was originally intended to be the last of the theaters to undergo renovation, but those plans were accelerated so that the theater could become the home of the Great Lakes Shakespeare Festival, now Great Lakes Theater. The $4 million project was begun at the end of 1981 and completed in less than nine months. Work began on the State Theatre in May 1979, and was completed in the summer of 1984, after the addition of a new $7 million stagehouse. Renovation of the theater's three lobbies was completed in 1987. Restoration of the Palace Theatre began in 1987, and was finished the following year. As part of the project, expanded parking facilities were added to the complex.

Reconstruction of the Allen Theatre lagged behind the rest, partly because some felt that three theaters were enough for the district. However, in 1993 the Playhouse Square Foundation agreed to rent the theater with the intention of purchasing it, which it did in 1997. This acquisition made Playhouse Square the largest performing arts complex outside of New York in the United States, with more than 10,000 seats. The Allen re-opened in 1998.

Although the Hanna Theatre was the only one of the group not to close in 1968 or 1969, it was overshadowed by the revitalization of the Euclid Avenue theaters during the 1980s, and closed in 1989. However, the Hanna reopened in March 1996 – the 75th anniversary of its original opening. In 1999, the Playhouse Square Foundation acquired the Hanna, making it the fifth and last of the original theaters to be purchased by the foundation.

The Cleveland Theater District Development Corporation (CTDDC), now the Playhouse Square District Development Corporation (PDDC), was established in 1998 as a business improvement district to foster development in the theater district.

=== Recent years ===
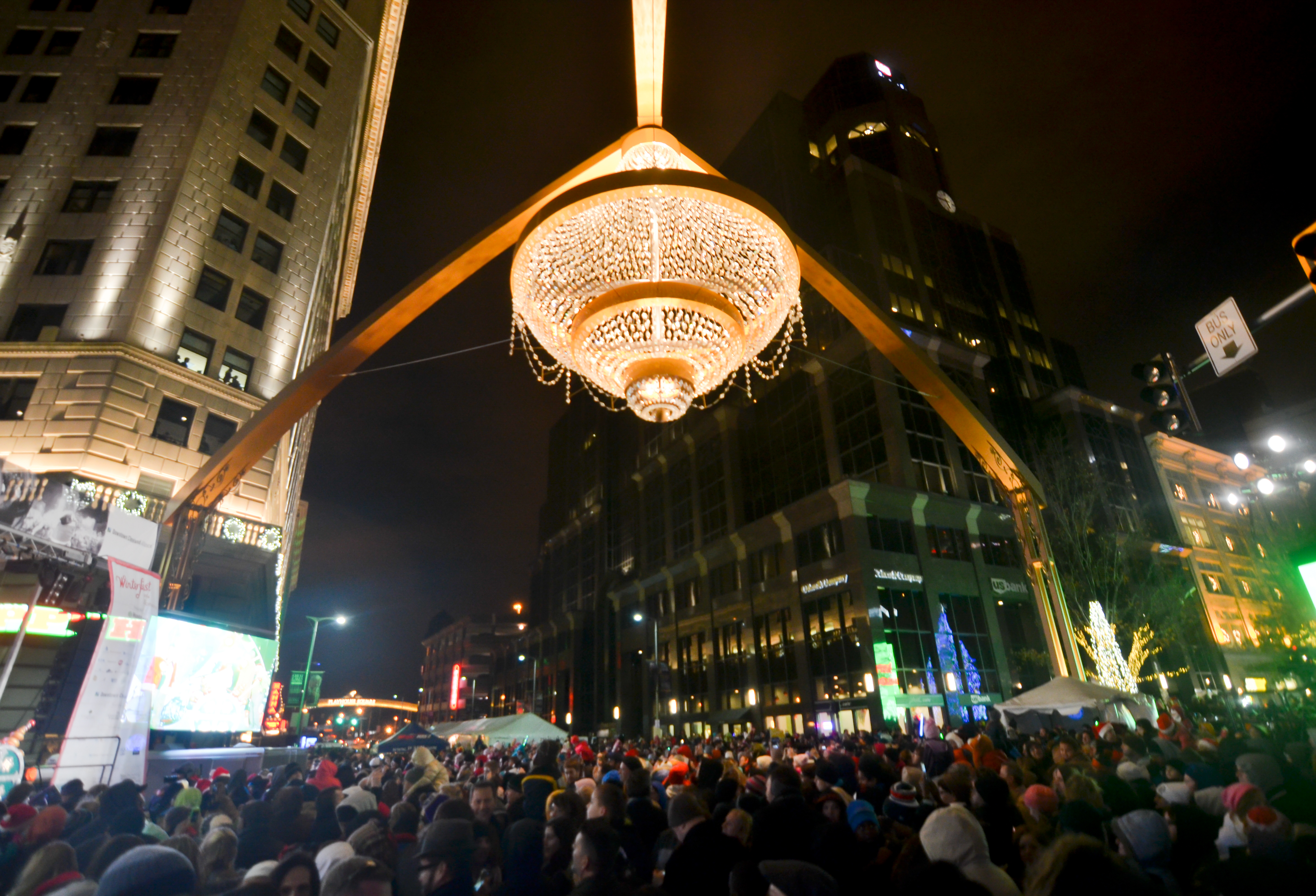
Winterfest at Playhouse Square.

The reopening of the State, Ohio and Palace Theatres encouraged further development at Playhouse Square, including the $40 million Renaissance Office Building and a Wyndham Hotel at Playhouse Square.

In 1999 The Playhouse Square established a Real Estate Services Division to support the organization's arts operations. Playhouse Square is active in area development.

In 2002, Playhouse Square opened the 14th Street Theatre as a home for Second City Cleveland and a venue for improvisational comedy, musical comedy and avant-garde fare, often for extended runs. The venue was closed in 2013 and transformed into the private dining space Cibreo Privato, part of the Italian restaurant Cibreo operated by Driftwood Restaurant Group.

In 2003, the area of East 14th Street near Playhouse Square was renamed Memory Lane-Bob Hope Way in honor of the longtime Cleveland resident to commemorate the entertainer's 100th birthday.

Playhouse Square and Cleveland's public broadcasting stations conducted a joint capital campaign to transform the One Playhouse Square Building into the Idea Center at Playhouse Square. Opened in 2005, it is now the home for Playhouse Square's community engagement and education programs and the downtown headquarters for radio stations WKSU (simulcast over a regional network including WCPN) and WCLV, as well as TV station WVIZ, incorporated together as Ideastream Public Media.

In 2008, the HealthLine opened with a station at Playhouse Square. The line connects Public Square to University Circle via the Cleveland Clinic.

Also in 2008, the Hanna Theatre underwent a thorough renovation with improvements to its stage including a new hydraulic lift system. The Hanna is now home to Great Lakes Theater, Cleveland's classic theater company which previously performed at the Ohio Theatre.

Through a collaboration called “The Power of Three,” Cleveland Play House, Cleveland State University and Playhouse Square partnered to create the Allen Theatre Complex, featuring a reconfigured Allen Theatre (re-opened 2011) and two new theaters that opened in 2012. Cleveland Play House and Cleveland State University's Department of Theatre and Dance are now resident companies at Playhouse Square. The Cleveland Play House administrative offices and all of Cleveland State University's arts programs are now located in the Middough Building on Playhouse Square's campus, adding to the vibrancy of the neighborhood.

Playhouse Square welcomes more than 1 million guests to 1,000+ performances and events each year. Its KeyBank Broadway Series season ticket holder base (more than 45,000) is the largest in the country, making Cleveland one of fewer than 10 markets that can support a three-week run of a touring Broadway show.

Improvements to the Playhouse Square neighborhood - including a digital signage network, upgrades to U.S. Bank Plaza, a retro signage feature and the GE Chandelier, the world's largest outdoor chandelier, located above the intersection of Euclid Avenue and East 14th Street - were completed between April 2013 and April 2014, culminating in a ceremony on May 2, 2014, entitled "Dazzle the District." In 2014 a $100 million capital fund campaign was initiated with a $9 million gift from the Chris Connor family of Cleveland. In honor of their gift the Palace Theatre was renamed Connor Palace. In honor of a $10 million gift from KeyBank in 2017, the State Theatre was renamed KeyBank State Theatre.

In April 2018 Playhouse Square began construction on The Lumen, a 34-story apartment tower. The tower adds 318 apartments to downtown Cleveland and contains a 550 space parking garage. The Tower opened in 2020.

The architecturally-significant Greyhound Bus Station on Chester Avenue was purchased by Playhouse Square on April 4, 2024, and it is anticipated that the building would be redeveloped into a mixed-use venue.

== List of theaters ==
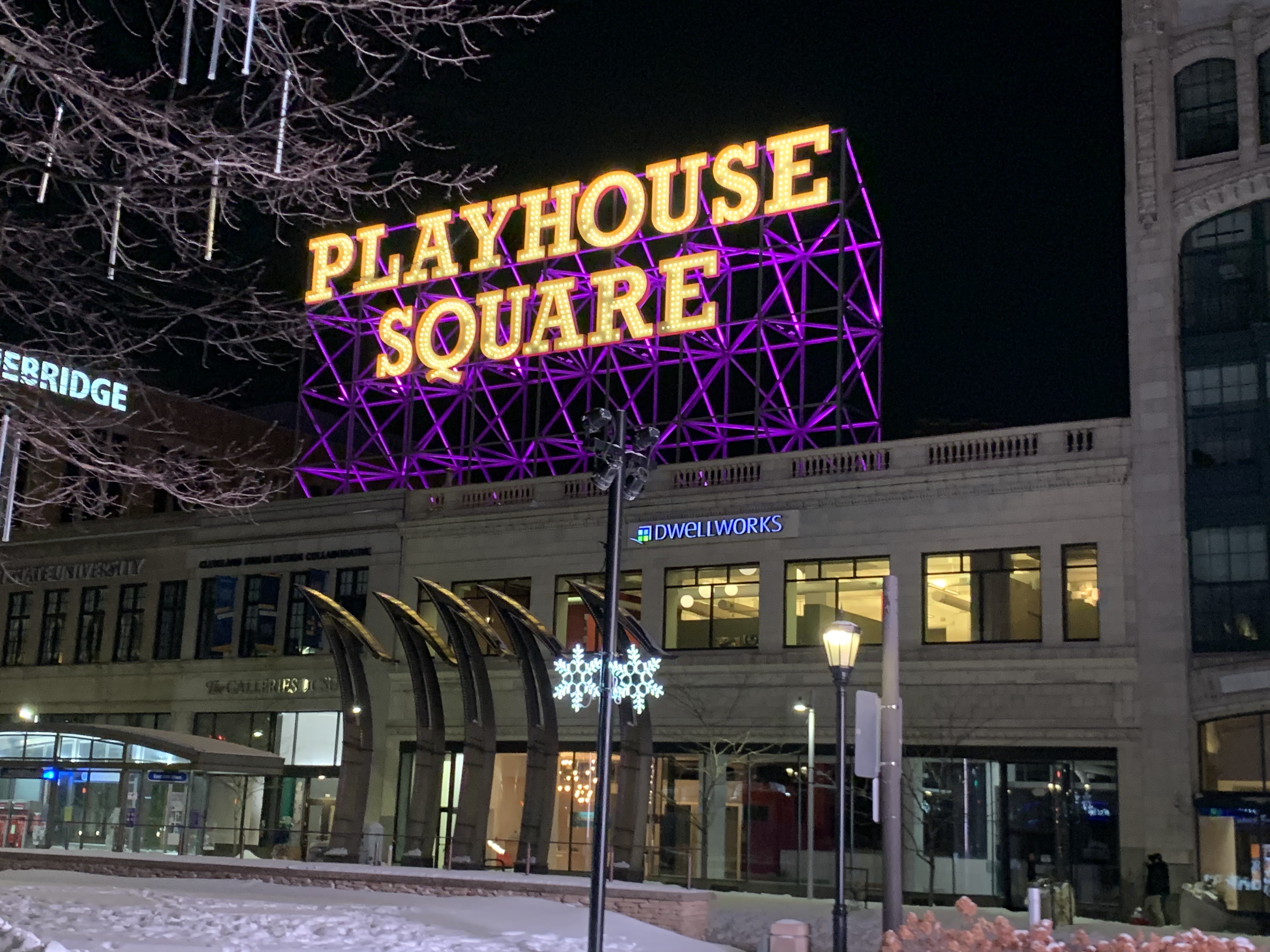
Playhouse square illuminated sign

- Allen Theatre
- Connor Palace
- Hanna Theatre
- The Helen Rosenfeld Lewis Bialosky Lab Theatre
- Kennedy's Cabaret
- KeyBank State Theatre
- Mimi Ohio Theatre
- Outcalt Theatre
- Upper Allen
- Westfield Studio Theatre

== List of resident companies ==
- Cleveland Ballet
- Cleveland Play House (Allen Theatre)
- Cleveland State University Department of Theatre and Dance (Allen Theatre)
- DANCECleveland
- Great Lakes Theater (Hanna Theatre)
- Tri-C Jazz Fest
