= The Helen Lab Theatre =

Helen Rosenfeld Lewis Bialosky Lab Theatre
- Interactive map of Helen Rosenfeld Lewis Bialosky Lab Theatre
- Address: Playhouse Square; Cleveland, Ohio; United States
- Coordinates: 41.501117°N 81.681426°W
- Capacity: 150
- Current use: Performing arts center

Construction
- Opened: 2011
- Years active: 2011-
- Architect: Westlake Reed Leskosky

The Helen Lab Theatre is a theater on Euclid Avenue in downtown Cleveland, Ohio, part of Playhouse Square. The smallest of three venues used by the Cleveland State University Department of Theatre and Dance and Cleveland Play House.
