= Euclid Avenue (Cleveland) =

Main thoroughfare in Cleveland, Ohio

Coordinates: 41°30′14″N 81°36′42″W

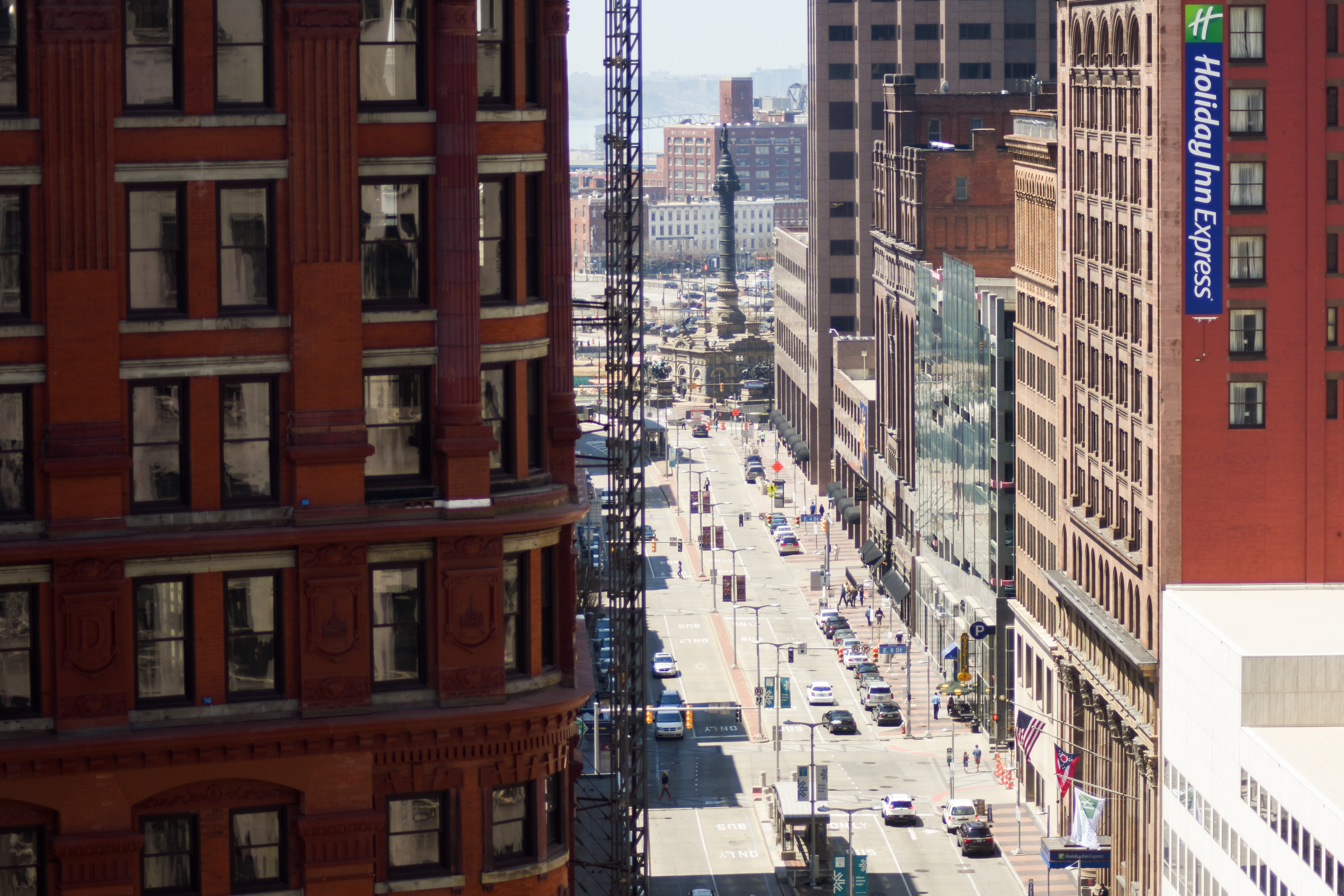
- Looking westbound on Euclid Avenue from above E. 9th Street and the Schofield Building. The Soldiers' and Sailors' Monument can be seen in the distance.
- Interactive map of Euclid Avenue
- Part of: US 6 / US 20 / US 322
- Length: 18.9 mi (30.4 km)
- Location: Cleveland, Ohio
- West end: US 6 / US 20 / US 42 / US 322 / US 422; SR 3 / SR 8 / SR 14 / SR 43 / SR 87 at Public Square
- Major junctions: US 322 in University Circle; US 6 in East Cleveland; US 6 / SR 84 in Euclid; I-90 in Wickliffe
- East end: US 20 / SR 174 in Willoughby

Construction
- Commissioned: 1815

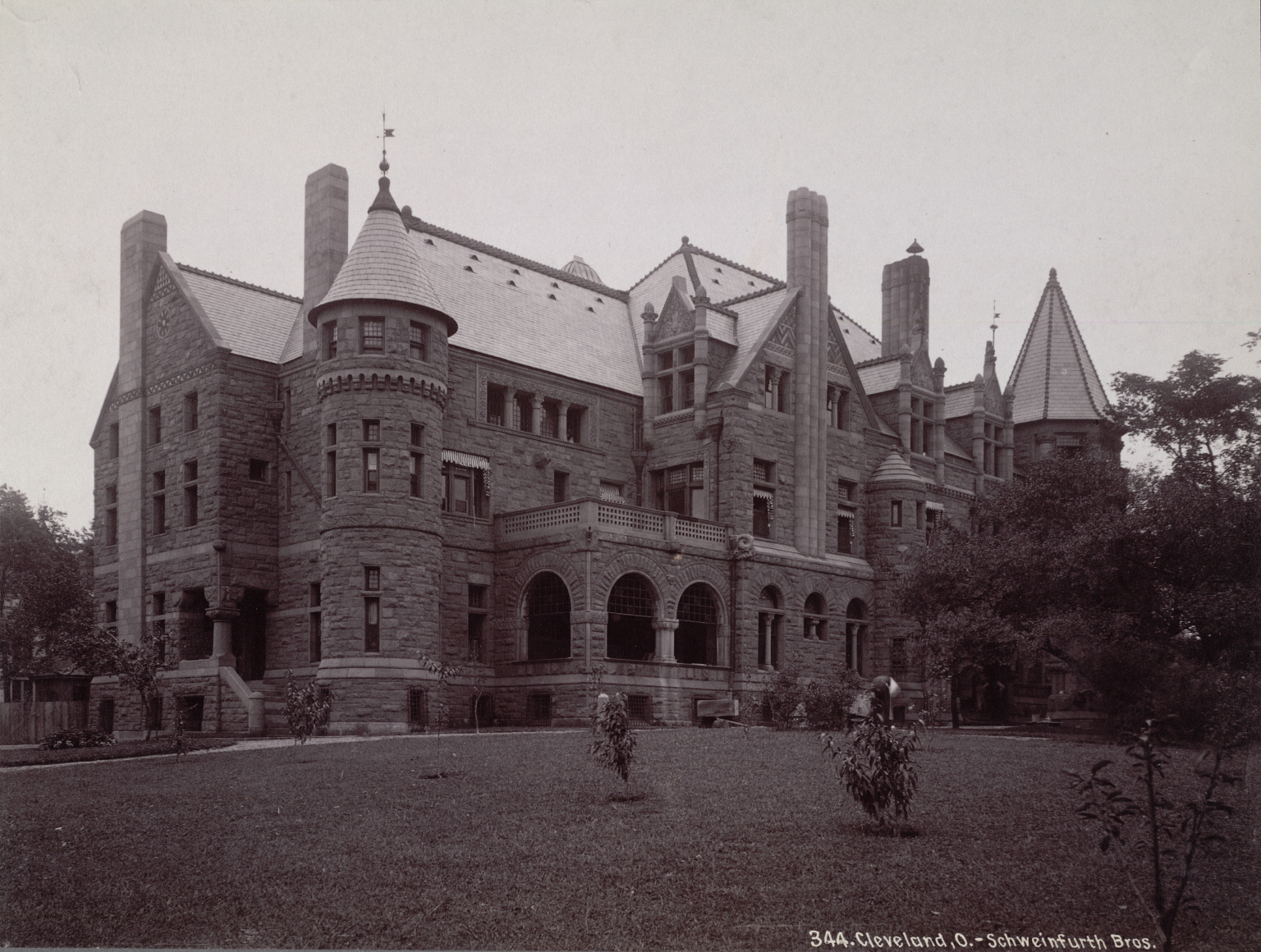
Sylvester T. Everett mansion on Euclid Avenue (since demolished), designed by Charles F. Schweinfurth

Euclid Avenue is a major street in Cleveland, Ohio, United States. It runs northeasterly from Public Square in Downtown Cleveland, passing Playhouse Square and Cleveland State University, to University Circle, the Cleveland Clinic, Severance Hall, Case Western Reserve University's Maltz Performing Arts Center (formerly the Temple Tifereth Israel), Case Western Reserve University and University Hospitals Case Medical Center. The street runs through the suburbs of East Cleveland, Euclid, and Wickliffe, to Willoughby as a part of U.S. Route 20 and U.S. Route 6. The HealthLine bus rapid transit line runs in designated bus lanes in the median of Euclid Avenue from Public Square to Louis Stokes Station at Windermere in East Cleveland.

It received nationwide attention from the 1860s to the 1920s for its beauty and wealth, including a string of mansions that came to be known as Millionaires' Row. There are several theaters, banks, and churches along Euclid, as well as Cleveland's oldest extant building, the Dunham Tavern. It can be reached through the Healthline.

== Millionaires' Row ==
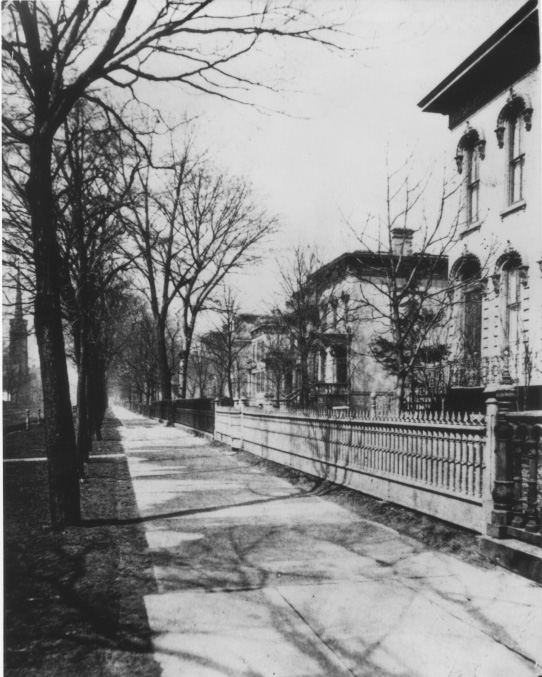
Homes on Euclid Avenue's "Millionaire's Row" (south side of Euclid Avenue), circa 1870

Advertising postcard (pre-1906) for the R&L Electric Car, taken in front of the Leonard Hanna mansion on Euclid Avenue

In the second half of the 19th century and early in the 20th century, Euclid Avenue was internationally known. Baedeker's Travel Guides called the elm-lined avenue "The Showplace of America", and designated it as a must see for travelers from Europe. The concentration of wealth was unparalleled; the tax valuation of the mansions along "the Avenue" far exceeded the valuation of New York's Fifth Avenue in the late 19th century. Accounts at the time compared it to the Avenue des Champs-Élysées in Paris and the Unter den Linden in Berlin.

Euclid Avenue was an elegant showcase for Cleveland's wealthy citizens, who built their high, grand mansions high on a ridge overlooking Lake Erie. Set two to five acres back from the avenue, which was paved with Medina sandstone, the mansions seemed to float amid spacious, landscaped grounds.

Families living along "Millionaires' Row" included those of John D. Rockefeller (during the period, 1868–84), Sylvester T. Everett, Isaac N. Pennock I (inventor of the first steel railway car in the US), arc light inventor Charles F. Brush, George Worthington, Horace Weddell, Marcus Hanna, Ambrose Swasey, Amasa Stone, John Hay (personal secretary to Abraham Lincoln and Secretary of State under William McKinley), Jeptha Wade (Cleveland benefactor and founder of Western Union Telegraph), Samuel Augustus Fuller (steel industrialist), Alfred Atmore Pope (iron industrialist and art collector), Charles E.J. Lang (automobile industrialist), Worthy S. Streator (railroad baron, coal mine developer, and founder of the city of Streator, Illinois), Mary Corinne Quintrell (clubwoman), and Charles Lathrop Pack. Euclid Avenue's most infamous resident was con artist Cassie Chadwick, the wife of Leroy Chadwick, who was unaware that his wife was passing herself off to bankers as the illegitimate daughter of steel magnate Andrew Carnegie.

Architect Charles F. Schweinfurth designed at least 15 mansions on the street. Samuel Livingston Mather II's Mansion, built around 1910, "was among the last" to be built on Euclid Avenue. The Mather Mansion remains as part of Cleveland State University, but most of the homes were later demolished.

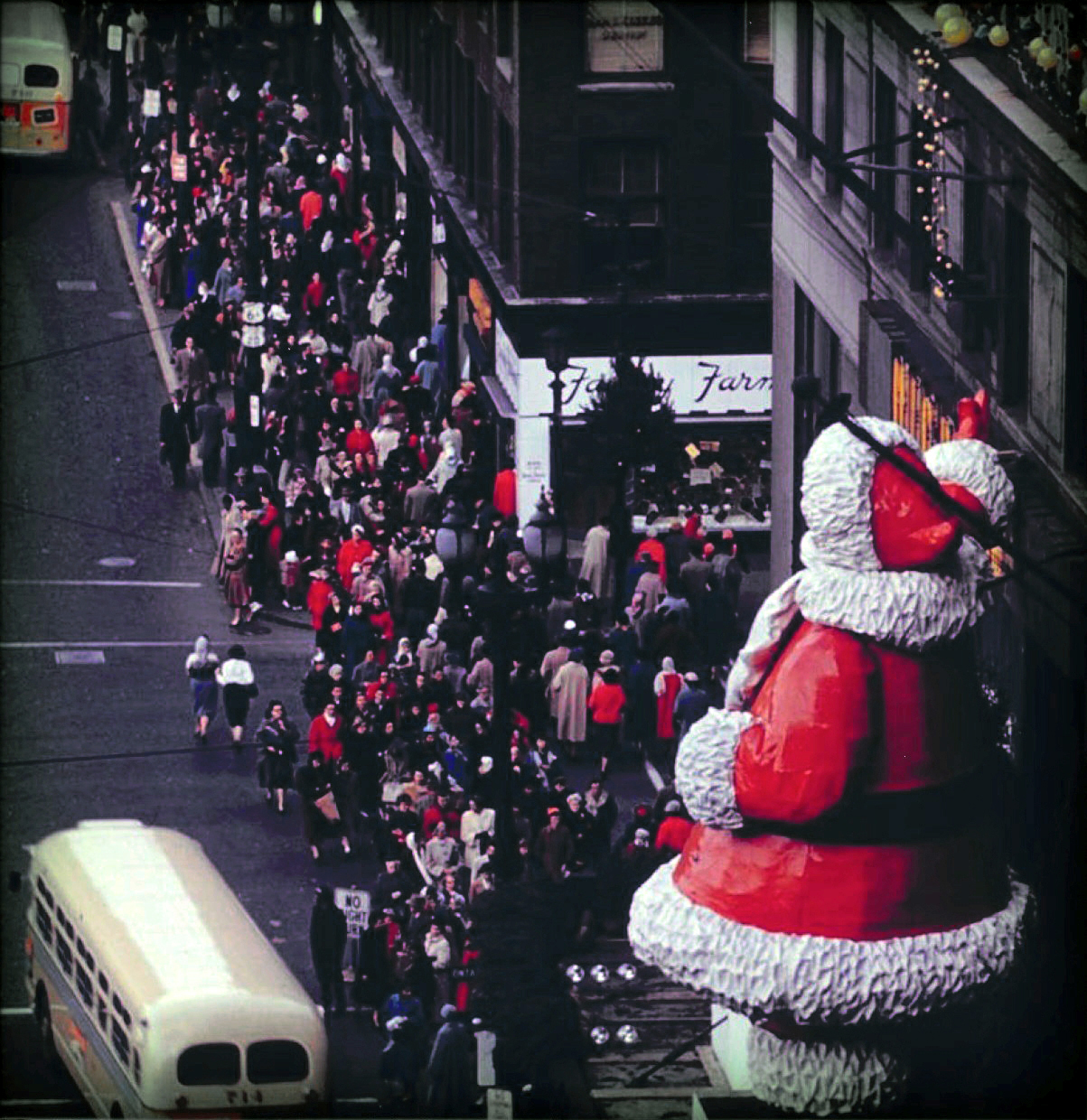
Christmas shoppers on Euclid Ave. and Ontario St. in the 1950s

== Growth of commercial district and decline of Millionaires' Row ==
Charles Lathrop Pack is credited with at least part of the development of Euclid Avenue, on which he lived from about 1888 to the early years of the 20th century, into a thriving business district. According to Eyle, "In 1913, an article about Charles reported that 'inside of ten years...the [one-story, commercial buildings that he had developed at the lower end of Euclid Avenue] have disappeared. In their stead are skyscrapers, great retail establishments, magnificent banks, and a hotel that cost $2,000,000. Much of the land is owned by Mr. Pack and is leased for long periods. He helped to organize the companies which erected the buildings. It is said that his rentals, out of which not a penny is subtracted for taxes or anything else, amount to $100,000 a year."

As Cleveland's commercial district began to push eastward along Euclid Avenue, families moved east towards University Circle. However, southeast of University Circle, the topography of the area rises sharply into what is referred to as "The Heights", and the development of Cleveland Heights and Shaker Heights, along with more efficient means of travel, became more attractive than the increasingly commercialized Euclid Avenue.

By the 1920s, the former "Millionaires' Row" was in decline. During the Great Depression, many mansions were converted by their owners into rooming houses, which accelerated the decline. In the 1950s, Cleveland's Innerbelt Freeway cut through the Euclid Avenue neighborhood between downtown and the rail crossing at East 55th Street. By the 1960s, the street that once rivaled Fifth Avenue as the most expensive address in the United States was a two-mile (3 km) long slum of commercial buildings and substandard housing. In the mid-1970s, Cleveland Cavaliers owner Nick Mileti announced plans to move the basketball club from Euclid Avenue's Cleveland Arena to a new arena in suburban Richfield Township.

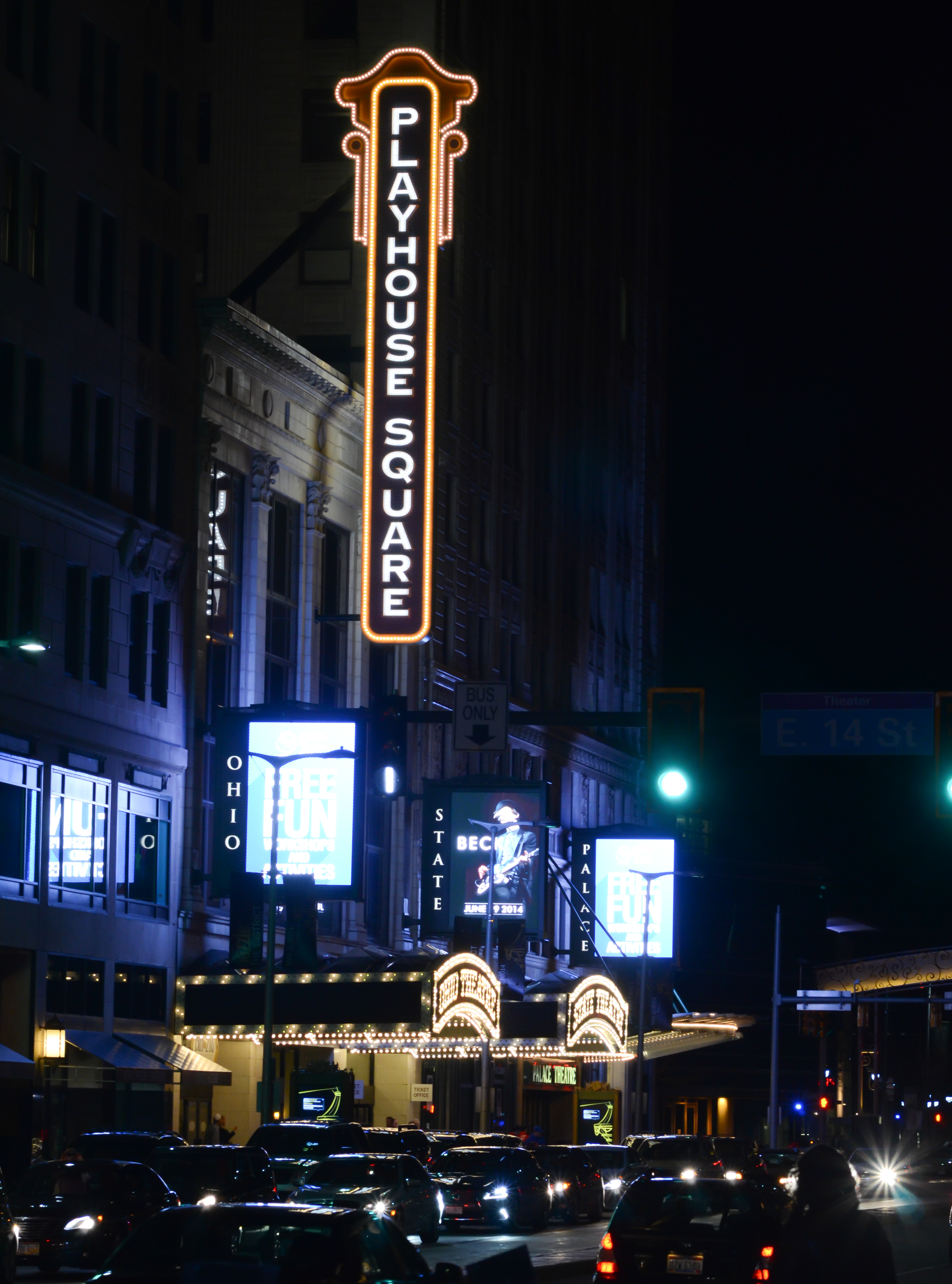
Playhouse Square faces Euclid Avenue.

== Legacies and redevelopment ==
Eight houses from the era remain on Euclid, including the Mather and Howe mansions owned and used by Cleveland State University. One of the most recent to be demolished was the Lyman Treadway Mansion, which served as part of the Cleveland Museum of Health from the 1930s until it was razed in 2002 for a new museum building.

The Euclid Avenue Historic District is listed on the National Register of Historic Places.

On August 5, 1914, the American Traffic Signal Company installed a traffic signal system on the corner of East 105th Street and Euclid Avenue, the first traffic light installed in the United States and the first electric traffic light in the world.

=== Theaters of Playhouse Square ===
In their 1949 musical South Pacific, Rodgers and Hammerstein indirectly acknowledged the street's fame. In the script, Captain Brackett sends a grass skirt to one "Amelia Fortuna, 325 Euclid Avenue, Shaker Heights, Cleveland, Ohio". Theaters on Euclid include the Allen Theatre, State Theatre, Ohio Theatre, and Palace Theater.

== Recent events ==
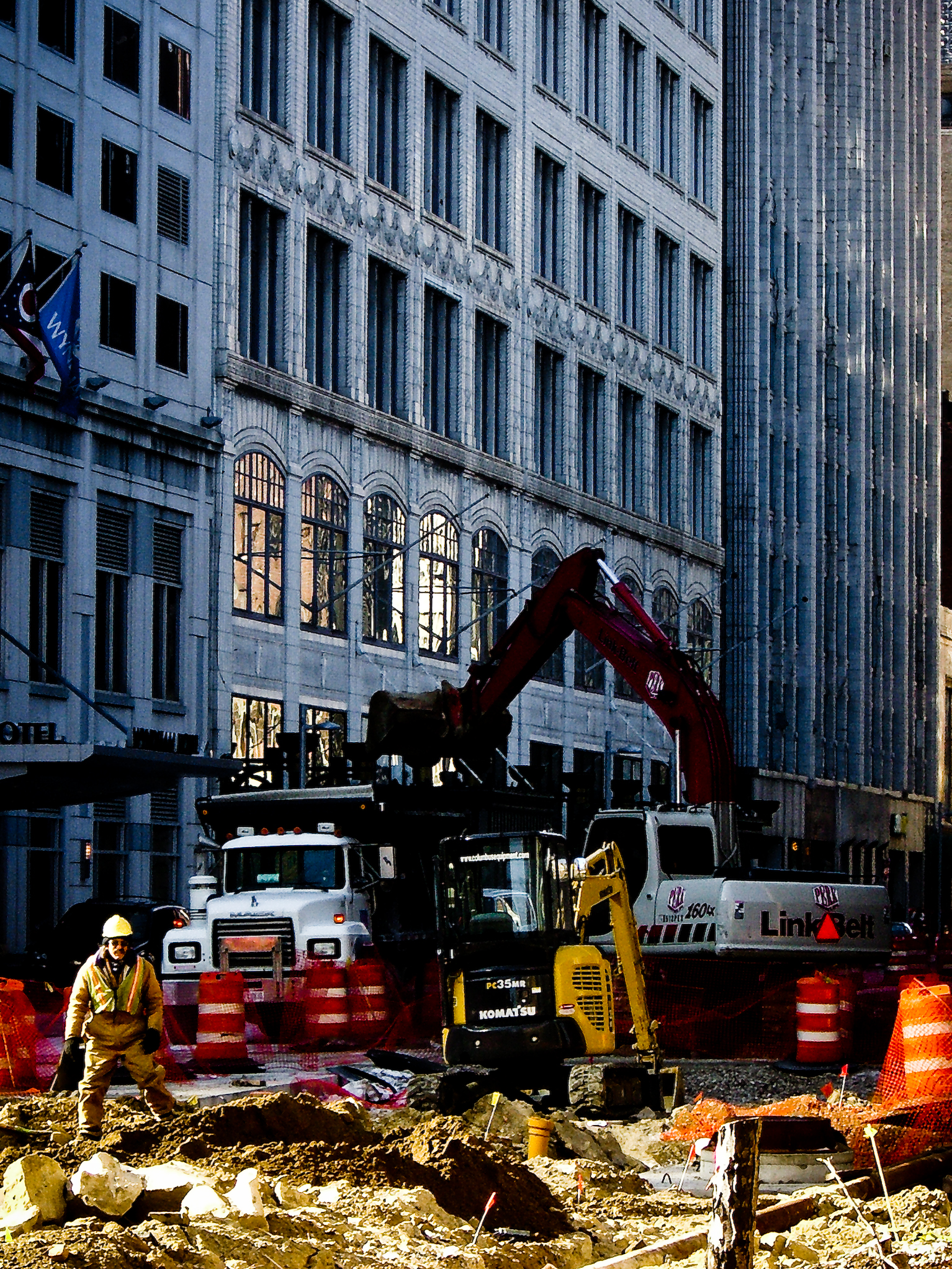
Euclid Avenue during the construction of the Euclid Corridor project

In April 2006, parts of Euclid Avenue were closed to traffic for the filming of a scene from the film Spider-Man 3. No major stars were on location, but the filming drew thousands of gawkers. Most of the filming involved explosions and destroyed cars, with hired extras walking the sidewalks. The sections of the street that were closed off were redressed to resemble a city street in New York City, complete with magazine stands and poster-covered walls.

The Greater Cleveland Regional Transit Authority completely refurbished the western section of Euclid Avenue as part of the Euclid Corridor Transportation Project, which opened fully in 2008. A bus rapid transit line, the HealthLine, now runs from Public Square to the Stokes Rapid Transit station in East Cleveland, which is the eastern terminus of the Red Line rapid transit route. The refurbishing also entailed development – as of November 2009, more than $3.3 billion worth of completed or proposed urban renewal projects lined the street and surrounding area.

== Route designations ==
Euclid Avenue, originally known as part of the Buffalo Stage Road, has carried various route designations throughout history:

- Prior to 1923 Euclid Avenue carried Inter-county Route 2 and Main Market Road VI in parts.
- In 1923, when Ohio introduced the modern numbering system, State Route 2 and State Route 15 were assigned to Euclid Avenue from Public Square in Cleveland to Mayfield Road in the University Circle neighborhood, and SR 2 was assigned to it from there to Willoughby.
- In 1926 SR 2 was rerouted onto Superior Avenue, leaving Euclid Avenue as only SR 15 from Public Square to Mayfield Road, and undesignated from there to Superior Avenue in East Cleveland.
- In 1927 U.S. Route 20 replaced SR 2 in most places including along Euclid Avenue, and U.S. Route 322 replaced SR 15.
- In 1932 U.S. Route 6 was added to the US 20 portion from Superior Avenue eastward to Euclid.
- In 1936 U.S. Route 6 Alternate and U.S. Route 20 Alternate were created to run along the US 322 portion from Public Square to Mayfield Road then along the previously undesignated section from there to Superior Avenue.
- In 1950 US 322 was shifted north to run along Superior Avenue and Chester Avenue from Public Square to Euclid Avenue in University Circle. US 322 remains on Euclid Avenue from Chester Avenue to Mayfield Road.
- In 1967 US 20 was removed from Superior Avenue and US 6 and placed on Euclid Avenue from Public Square to Superior Avenue in East Cleveland, replacing Alt. US 6 and Alt. US 20.

== Landmarks on Euclid ==
=== Public Square ===
- 200 Public Square Building (1982–1986)
- Soldiers and Sailors Monument (1894; renovated 2008–2010)

=== East 4th Street District ===
- Cleveland Arcade (1890)
- 5th Street Arcades – 530 Euclid Avenue
- 1040 Woodview Road
- PNC Bank Guardian Bank Building (1890)

=== Nine-Twelve District ===
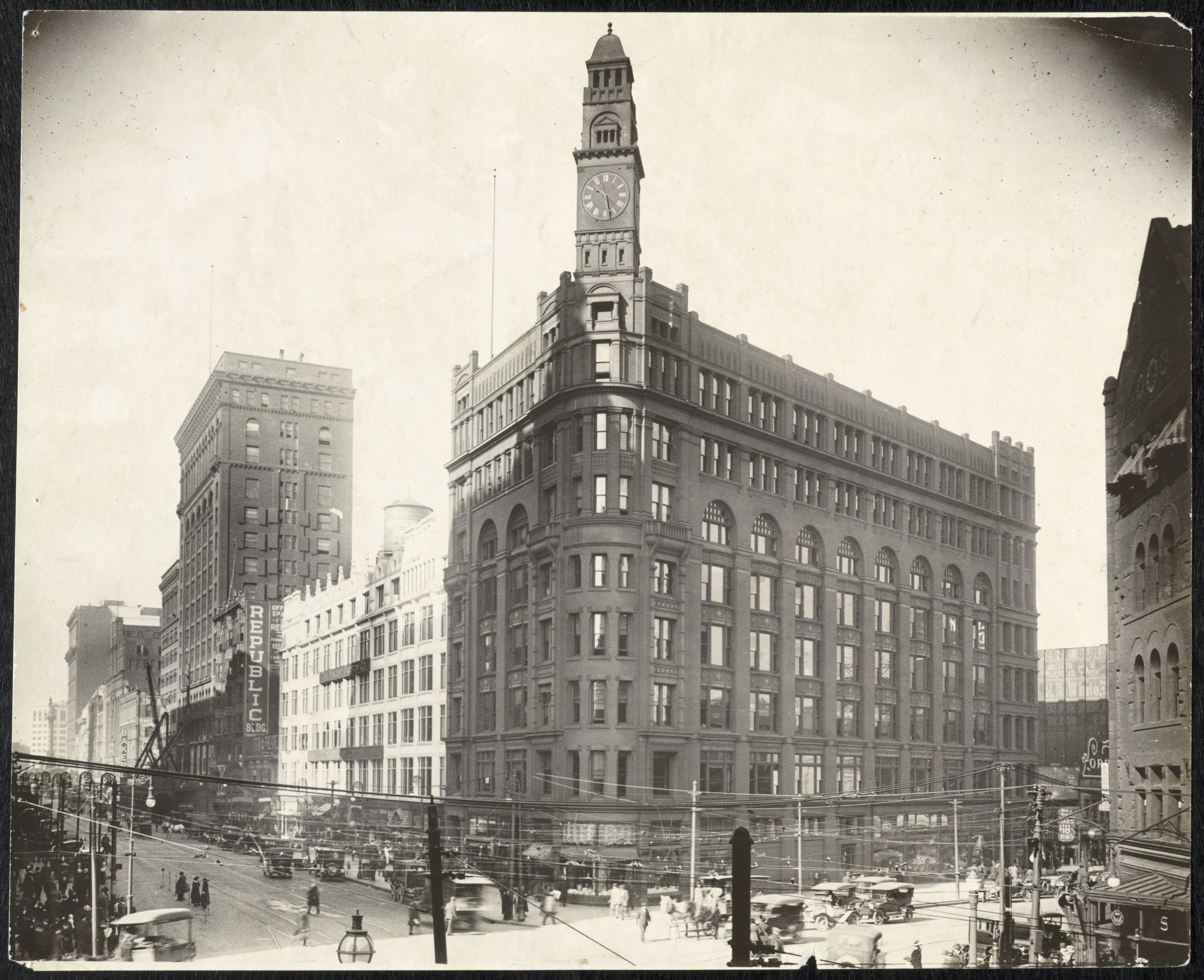
The Hickox Building in 1920. Demolished in 1946, the building was located at Euclid and East 9th (today the location of the PNC Center).

- The 9 Cleveland
  - Cleveland Trust Company Building headquarters building (1908)
  - Swetland Building (1910)
- City Club Building
- PNC Center (1980)
- Huntington Bank Building (1922–24)
- 1010 Euclid
- The Schofield

=== East 12th ===
- Statler Arms Apartments
- Union Club
- Halle Brothers Co. Building (studios for Audacy stations WDOK, WKRK-FM, WNCX, and WQAL; exterior was used on The Drew Carey Show)
- Sterling Lindner Davis

=== East 14th St. ===
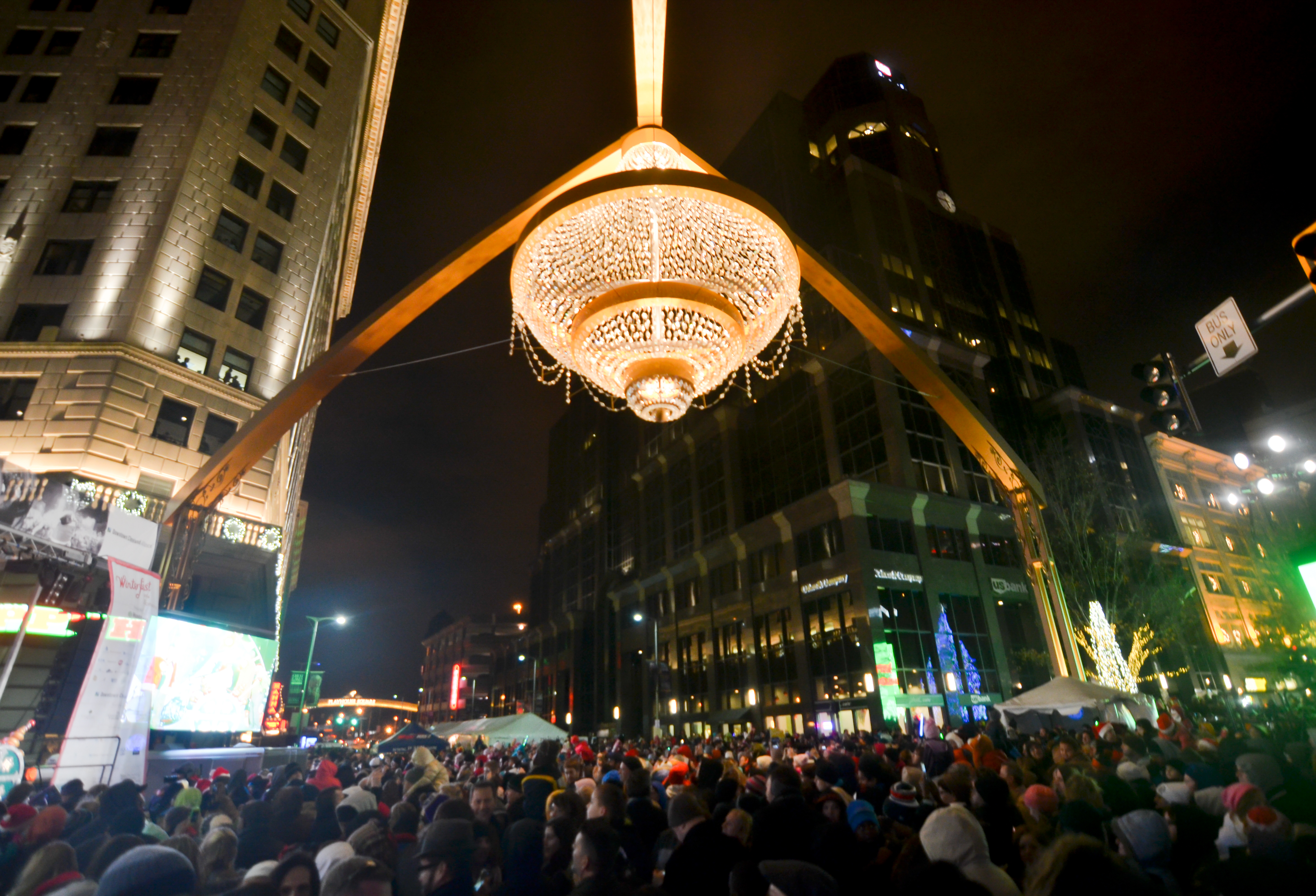
GE Chandelier soon after installation in 2014

- The ideastream Idea Center (studios for PBS affiliate WVIZ, NPR affiliate WKSU, and classical music WCLV)
- Wyndham Hotel
- U.S. Bank Centre
- GE Chandelier, world's largest outdoor chandelier

==== Playhouse Square ====
- Hanna Theatre
- Allen Theatre
- Ohio Theatre
- State Theatre
- Palace Theater
- Keith Building

=== East 17th-East 24th St. ===
- Innerbelt
- Maxine Goodman Levin College of Urban Affairs
- Cleveland-Marshall College of Law
- Washkewicz College of Engineering
- Fenn Tower
- Trinity Cathedral
- The Edge On Euclid

==== Cleveland State University Campus ====
- CSU School of Communication
- CSU Student Center
- CSU Main Library/Rhodes Tower
- Main Classrooms
- CSU Science Building

=== East 30th St. ===
- WEWS-TV
- Cuyahoga Board of Elections
- Applied Industrial Technologies
- Karpinski Engineering

=== Midtown East 55th St. ===
- Agora Theatre and Ballroom
- Euclid Avenue station (demolished)

=== East 105th St. ===
- Cleveland Clinic Campus
- University Circle
  - Severance Hall
  - Cleveland Museum of Art
  - Case Western Reserve University
  - University Hospitals of Cleveland
- East Cleveland, Ohio
- Euclid, Ohio
- Wickliffe, Ohio
  - Telshe Yeshiva
- Center For Pastoral Leadership (Catholic Diocese of Cleveland Seminaries)

== See also ==
- History of Cleveland
- Superior Avenue

== Notes ==
- Eyle, Alexandra. 1992. Charles Lathrop Pack: Timberman, Forest Conservationist, and Pioneer in Forest Education. Syracuse, NY: ESF College Foundation, Inc., and College of Environmental Science and Forestry. Distributed by Syracuse University Press. Available: books
- Wilson, Ella G. 1932. Famous Old Euclid Ave. Cleveland.
