= State Theatre (Cleveland) =

Theater in Cleveland, Ohio, United States

Coordinates: 41°30′3″N 81°40′51″W

KeyBank State Theatre
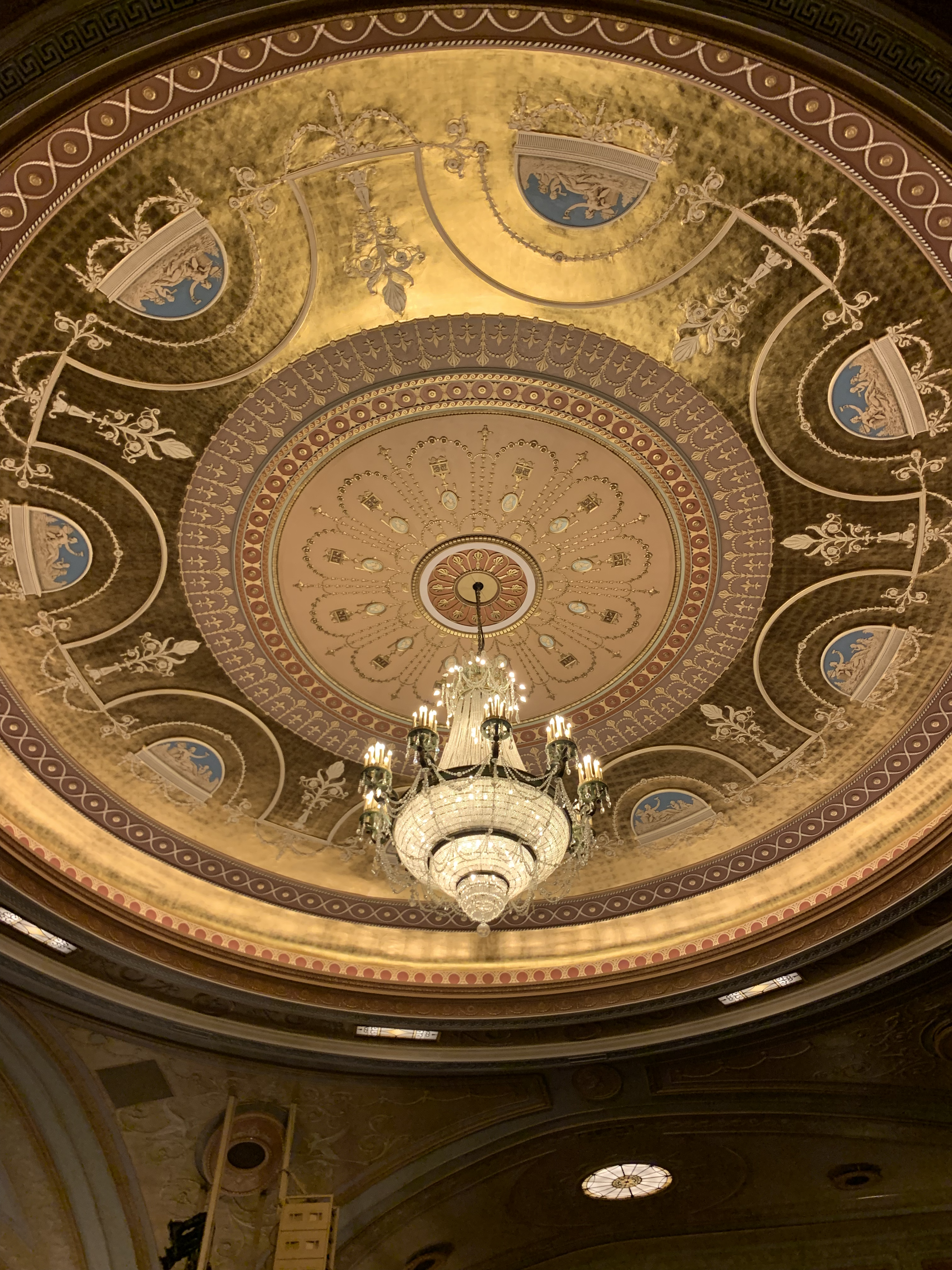
- Main chandelier in the State Theatre
- Interactive map of KeyBank State Theatre
- Address: 1519 Euclid Avenue; Cleveland, Ohio; United States
- Owner: Playhouse Square Center
- Capacity: 3,200
- Current use: Performing arts center

Construction
- Opened: 1921
- Rebuilt: 1984
- Architect: Thomas W. Lamb

Website
- www.playhousesquare.org

The KeyBank State Theatre is a theater located at 1519 Euclid Avenue in downtown Cleveland, Ohio. It is one of the theaters that make up Playhouse Square. It was designed by the noted theater architect Thomas W. Lamb and was built in 1921 by Marcus Loew to be the flagship of the Ohio branch of the Loew's Theatres company.

Loew's State Theatre, as it was known then, was built in an Italian Renaissance style and was intended to show vaudeville shows and movies. It opened on February 5, 1921, seating 3,400. Because of the desirability of having the theater's marquee on Euclid Avenue, the State Theatre was built at the back of the lot it shares with the Ohio Theatre, but with a 320-foot-long (98 m) series of three lobbies. This was the world's longest lobby serving a single theater, and it contained four huge murals by James Daugherty, entitled The Spirit of Pageantry—Africa, The Spirit of Drama—Europe, The Spirit of Cinema—America, and The Spirit of Fantasy—Asia. The theater was converted for the exhibition of Cinerama in 1967, but, due to financial trouble, closed in early February 1969, along with the rest of the Playhouse Square theaters.

The cover of the February 27, 1970 issue of Life was a two-page pull-out featuring The Spirit of Cinema America, which inspired the creation of the Playhouse Square Association. Two years later in 1972, and again in 1977, both the State and Ohio Theatres were threatened with demolition to build a parking lot, but were saved through public outcry.

In 1973, the newly formed Playhouse Square Foundation obtained a long-term lease for the Palace and State, and Ohio Theatres, and by 1977, the Loew's Building was purchased by Cuyahoga County. Also in 1973, the musical revue Jacques Brel is Alive and Well and Living in Paris opened in the State Theatre's lobby. The revue was expected to run for three weeks, but instead played for two years, making it the "longest-running show in Cleveland history." In 1978, the State was added to the National Register of Historic Places as part of Playhouse Square.

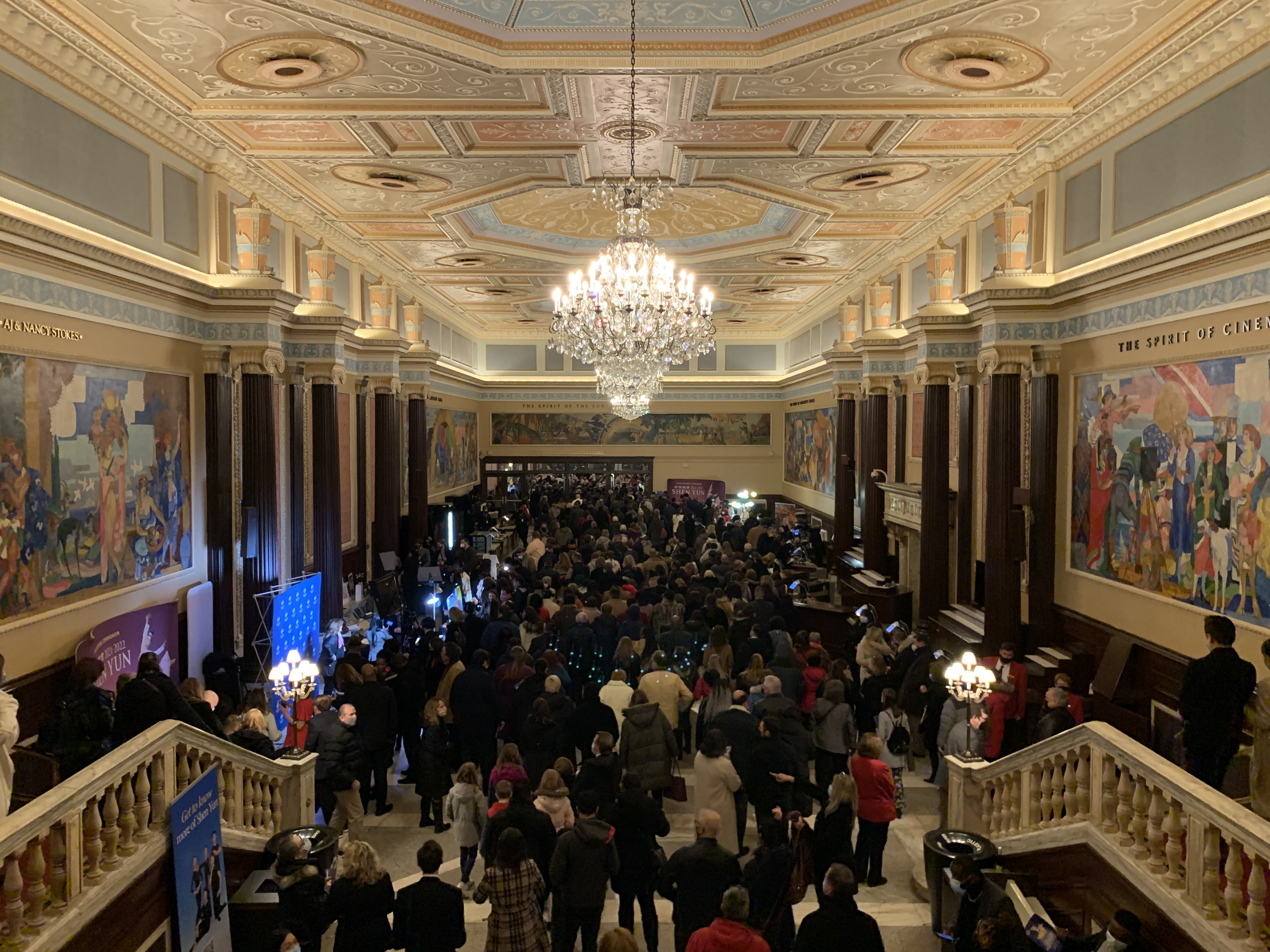
State Theatre lobby after a performance of Shen Yun in 2022

Restoration of the theater began in 1979, and was completed in the summer of 1984, after the addition of a $7 million stagehouse. The State Theatre reopened on June 4 of that year, becoming the home of the Cleveland Ballet and Cleveland Opera. With the restoration, seating capacity was reduced to the present 3,200.

The State Theatre was renamed KeyBank State Theatre in 2017 in honor of a $10 million gift to the Playhouse Square Advancing the Legacy Campaign.
