= Ohio Theatre (Cleveland, Ohio) =

Playhouse Square theater, Cleveland, Ohio

Coordinates: 41°30′4″N 81°40′52″W

Mimi Ohio Theatre
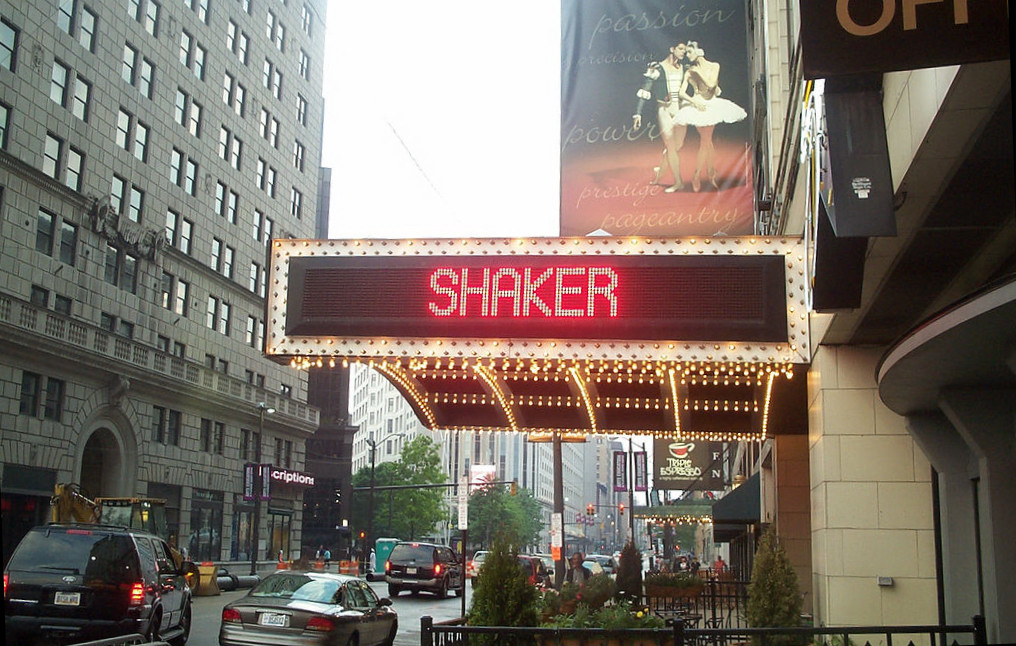
- The theatre's marquee
- Interactive map of Mimi Ohio Theatre
- Address: 1511 Euclid Avenue; Cleveland, Ohio; United States
- Owner: Playhouse Square Center
- Capacity: 1,000
- Current use: Performing arts center

Construction
- Opened: 1921
- Rebuilt: 1982
- Architect: Thomas W. Lamb

Website
- www.playhousesquare.org
- Mimi Ohio Theatre
- U.S. Historic district – Contributing property
- Location within Ohio Location within the United States
- Built: 1920
- Part of: Playhouse Square (ID78002041)
- Added to NRHP: October 5, 1978

The Mimi Ohio Theatre is a theater on Euclid Avenue in downtown Cleveland, Ohio, part of Playhouse Square. The theater was built by Marcus Loew's Loew's Theatres company.

== History ==
It was designed by Thomas W. Lamb in the Italian Renaissance style, and was intended to present legitimate plays. The theater opened on February 14, 1921, with 1,338 seats. The foyer featured three murals depicting the story of Venus, and the balcony contained paintings of Arcadia. Throughout the 1920s, the Ohio had a stock company and hosted traveling Broadway plays.

In 1935, the theater was redecorated in an Art Deco style and transformed into a supper club called the Mayfair Casino. The owners hoped to turn the establishment into an actual casino, but since gambling was not allowed in Ohio, the Mayfair closed in 1936. The Loew's Theatres chain reopened the Ohio in 1943 as a first-run movie theater. A 1964 lobby fire also damaged the auditorium interior. The theater was reopened again after the lobby was rebuilt along modern lines. The auditorium was painted red to hide smoke damage. Decreasing patronage caused the theater to close in early February 1969, along with the rest of the Playhouse Square theaters. Twice the Ohio and State Theatres were threatened with razing in order to build a parking lot; in 1972, when the buildings were saved by public outcry, and again in 1977. The Playhouse Square Foundation responded by obtaining a long-term lease for the theaters, and the Loew's Building was purchased by Cuyahoga County. In 1978, the Ohio was added to the National Register of Historic Places, along with the rest of the Playhouse Square group.

Because of the extent of the building's fire damage, the Ohio was originally slated to be the last of the group to undergo renovation, but plans were accelerated so that the theater could become the home of the Great Lakes Shakespeare Festival. The $4 million restoration took less than nine months, and on July 9, 1982, the Ohio Theatre became the first Playhouse Square theater to reopen, with 1,000 seats, playing Shakespeare's As You Like It.

The 1964 fire had so badly damaged the lobby that funding and time allowed for only a simple, contemporary design for the space in 1982. In 2016, Playhouse Square re-created the original 1921 lobby. The space was renamed "the George Gund Foundation Lobby" in recognition of a contribution that made the re-creation possible.
