= Schweinfurth =

Schweinfurth may refer to:

== People ==
- Albert C. Schweinfurth, American architect
- Charles F. Schweinfurth, American architect
- Georg August Schweinfurth (1836-1925) Baltic German botanist and ethnologist
- Julius A. Schweinfurth, American architect
- George Furth (né Schweinfurth) American librettist, playwright, and actor

== Places ==
- Schweinfurth, Gröditz, a former municipality in northern Saxony, now part of Gröditz
- Schweinfurt, a city in the Lower Franconia region of Bavaria in Germany, sometimes spelled Schweinfurth in older literature
