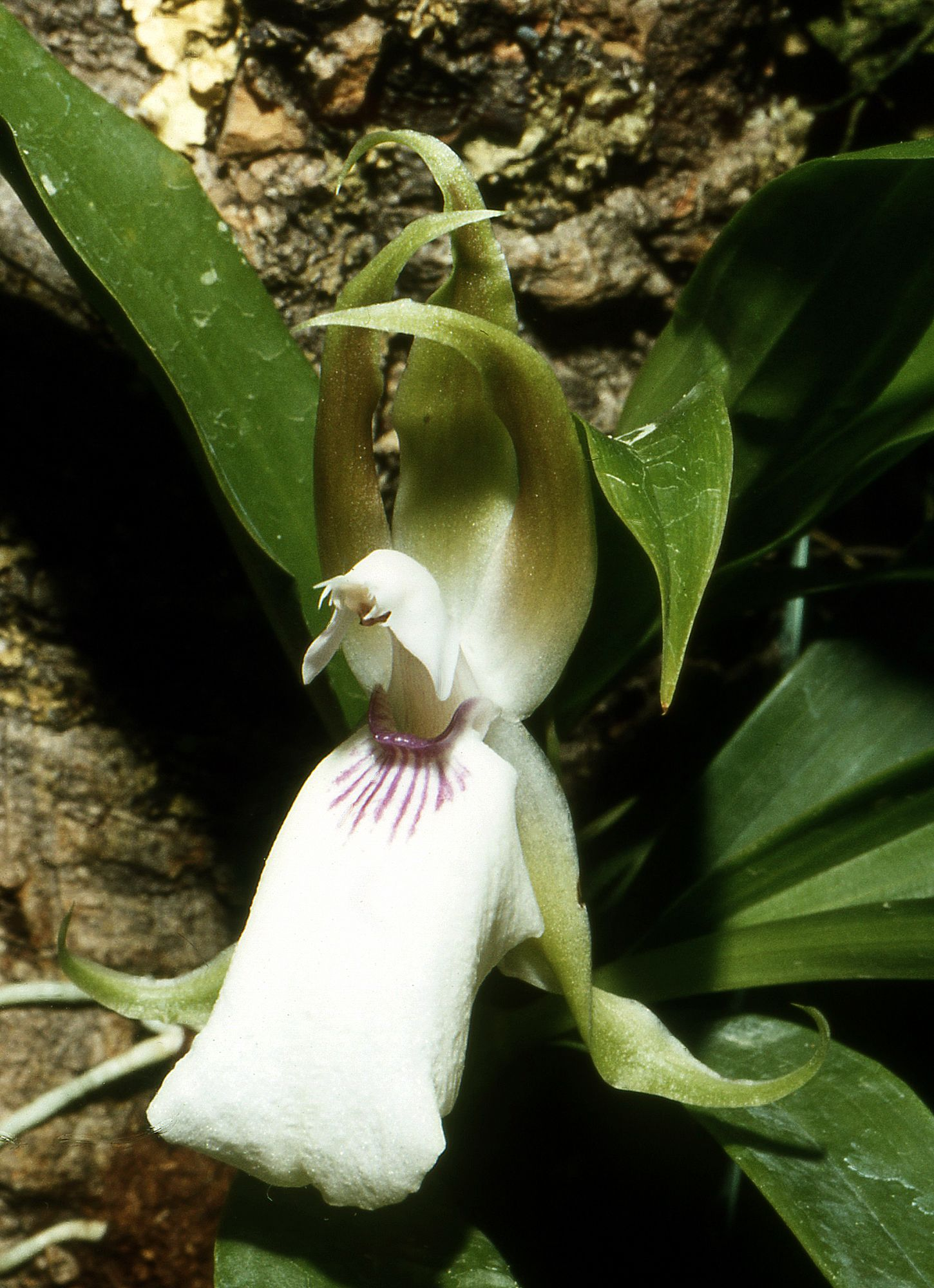
- Zygosepalum labiosum flower

Scientific classification
- Kingdom: Plantae
- Clade: Tracheophytes
- Clade: Angiosperms
- Clade: Monocots
- Order: Asparagales
- Family: Orchidaceae
- Subfamily: Epidendroideae
- Genus: Zygosepalum
- Species: Z. labiosum

Binomial name
- Zygosepalum labiosum (Rich.) C.Schweinf.

Synonyms
- Zygopetalum rostratum Raf.

= Zygosepalum labiosum =

Species of orchid

Zygosepalum labiosum is an epiphytic orchid found in South America, growing in dense shade at up to 400 m (1,300 ft) in elevation.

== Description ==
Zygosepalum labiosum has scandent rhizomes with ovoid pseudobulbs. Its leaves are 25 cm (9.8 in) long. The orchid's inflorescence is up to 20 cm (7.9 in) long with one to three flowers. The flowers are up to 10 cm (3.9 in) in width, with greenish sepals and petals with red markings at their base. The lip is white with a violet callus and violet veins.
