= Sarah J. Baker School =

- U.S. National Register of Historic Places
- U.S. Historic district – Contributing property
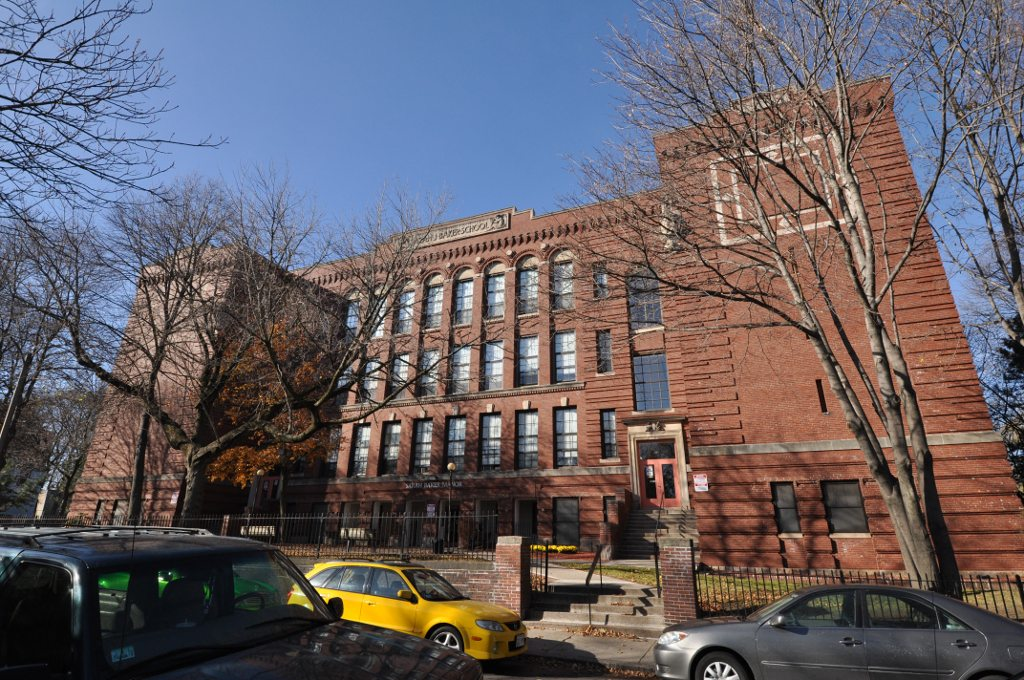

- Location within Massachusetts Location within the United States
- Location: 33 Perrin Street, Boston, Massachusetts
- Coordinates: 42°19′20″N 71°4′48″W
- Area: 1 acre (0.40 ha)
- Built: 1905
- Architect: Julius Schweinfurth; John J. Craig
- Architectural style: Romanesque Revival
- Part of: Moreland Street Historic District (ID84002890)
- NRHP reference No.: 83004285

Significant dates
- Added to NRHP: July 7, 1983
- Designated CP: March 29, 1984

The Sarah J. Baker School is an historic school building in Boston, Massachusetts. Built in 1905 by a prominent local architect, it is a well-preserved example of early 20th-century Romanesque Revival school architecture. The building was listed on the National Register of Historic Places in 1983, and was included in the Moreland Street Historic District in 1984. It has been converted to elderly housing.

== Description and history ==
The former Sarah J. Baker School building is located in a residential area of eastern Roxbury, on the west side of Perrin Street between Waverly and Moreland Streets. It is a 3 1/2-story masonry structure, built with load-bearing brick walls trimmed in limestone, and set on a tall basement. It has an H-shaped layout, with a substantial center flanked by projecting wings. There are no windows on the front-facing ends of the wings outside the basement level, which is separated from the other floors by a stone water table. Building corners feature brickwork that is quoin-like in appearance. Windows on the central section are set in rectangular openings on the first two floors, and round-arch openings on the third; the first-floor windows are topped by stone keystones. Building entrances are set at the ends of the central section.

The building was designed by architect Julius Schweinfurth and was built in 1905. It was named for the first female school principal in the Boston Public Schools, and was one of five schools designed for the city by Schweinfurth, who had previously worked as a draftsman at Peabody and Stearns.

== See also ==
- National Register of Historic Places listings in southern Boston, Massachusetts
