= Clarissa Peters Russell =

American painter

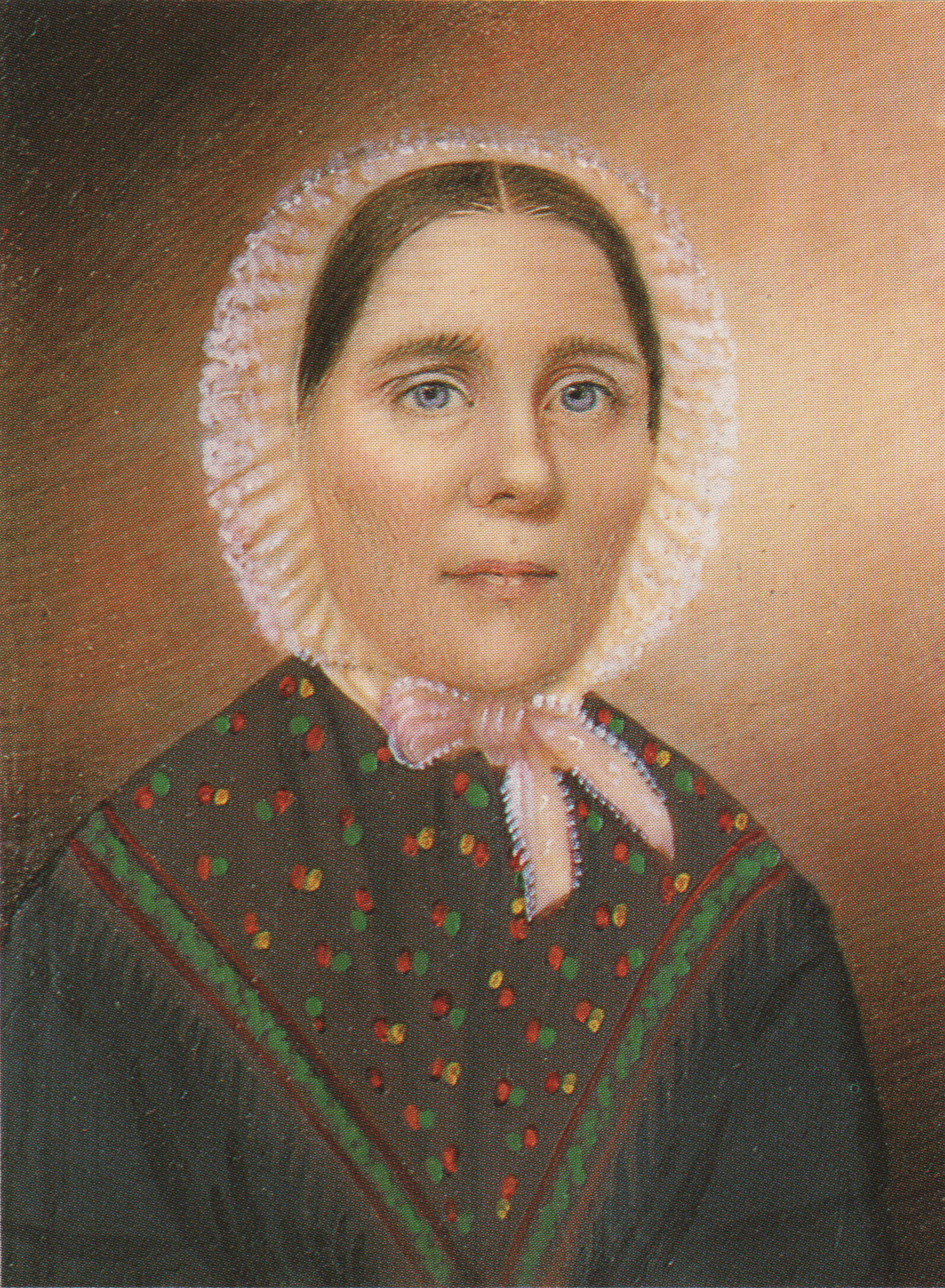
- Self-Portrait by Clarissa Peters Russell, c. 1850
- Born: January 1, 1809
- Died: August 12, 1854 (aged 45)
- Known for: miniatures
- Relatives: Sara Peters Grozelier (sister)

Clarissa Peters Russell (February 1, 1809 – August 12, 1854) was an American miniaturist. Her name is often given as Mrs. Moses B. Russell.

A native of Andover, Massachusetts, Russell was one of twelve children; her younger sister, Sara Peters Grozelier, also became a miniaturist. Their parents were Elizabeth Farrington Davis and John Peters; the Peters family had long been prominent in local affairs, and her father served as chairman of the town's board of selectmen. The details of Clarissa's early education are not known, but it has been suggested that she studied at the Franklin Academy, the first incorporated school in Massachusetts to admit women and the institution attended by her sister Emily from 1836 to 1838. Early in her professional life she is believed to have taught at the Blue Hill Academy in Blue Hill, Maine. She is known to have been in that town in 1831, and it is thought that she may have received some instruction in watercolor painting from Jonathan Fisher, a local polymath and graduate of Harvard University. By 1835 she was in Boston, painting miniatures and giving instruction in the art as well. Clarissa married the painter Moses B. Russell, with whom she had sought instruction in painting, in Providence, Rhode Island, in 1839; their son, Albert Cuyp Russell, became an engraver and illustrator who worked with his uncle, Leopold Grozelier.

The Russells were active in Boston from around 1842 to 1854, living on School Street and exhibiting work at the Boston Athenaeum; Clarissa also showed work at the Boston Artists Association, in 1842 and 1843, and at the Art and Mechanics Associations. Her first exhibition was in 1841, at the Third Exhibition of the Massachusetts Charitable Mechanic Association; the Boston Evening Transcript gave her a favorable notice. She and her husband worked closely together, and their styles are similar enough that it is difficult to tell their work apart; furthermore, her paintings, which are often either unsigned or bear her husband's name, have sometimes been mistaken for those of Joseph Whiting Stock. Her style, which is reminiscent of that of her New England contemporaries such as William Matthew Prior, has been called by one writer "highly finished though somewhat defective in drawing"; another has spoken of her "penchant for realism in combination with decorative fabric". She appears to have specialized in portraits of children, given the numbers of these from her hand which have survived.

Russell remained actively sought after as a portraitist until her death. She was buried either in the Second Burying Ground in North Andover, Massachusetts, or in Ridgewood Cemetery, also in North Andover; one of the markers is a cenotaph, but it is not known which. The latter marker honors her husband and son as well. Such was her stature that the Boston Atlas memorialized her with a front-page obituary, and notices were published in other papers as well.

A self-portrait by Russell, dating to around 1850, was included in the inaugural exhibition of the National Museum of Women in the Arts, American Women Artists 1830–1930, in 1987. A portrait of a baby and dog attributed to her is currently in the collection of the Metropolitan Museum of Art, as are another portrait of a baby and a painting of the three Starbird children of Charlestown, Massachusetts; this last is the only one of the three whose attribution to her is secure. Another miniature of a child is in the Cincinnati Art Museum. An album of watercolors of flowers and plants, likely her earliest surviving work, is currently owned by the North Andover Historical Society. Her paintings are sometimes described as having "primitive vestiges", and her work is highly sought after by collectors of folk art.
