= Unitarian Universalist Church of Berkeley =

Coordinates: 37.917848°N 122.282721°W

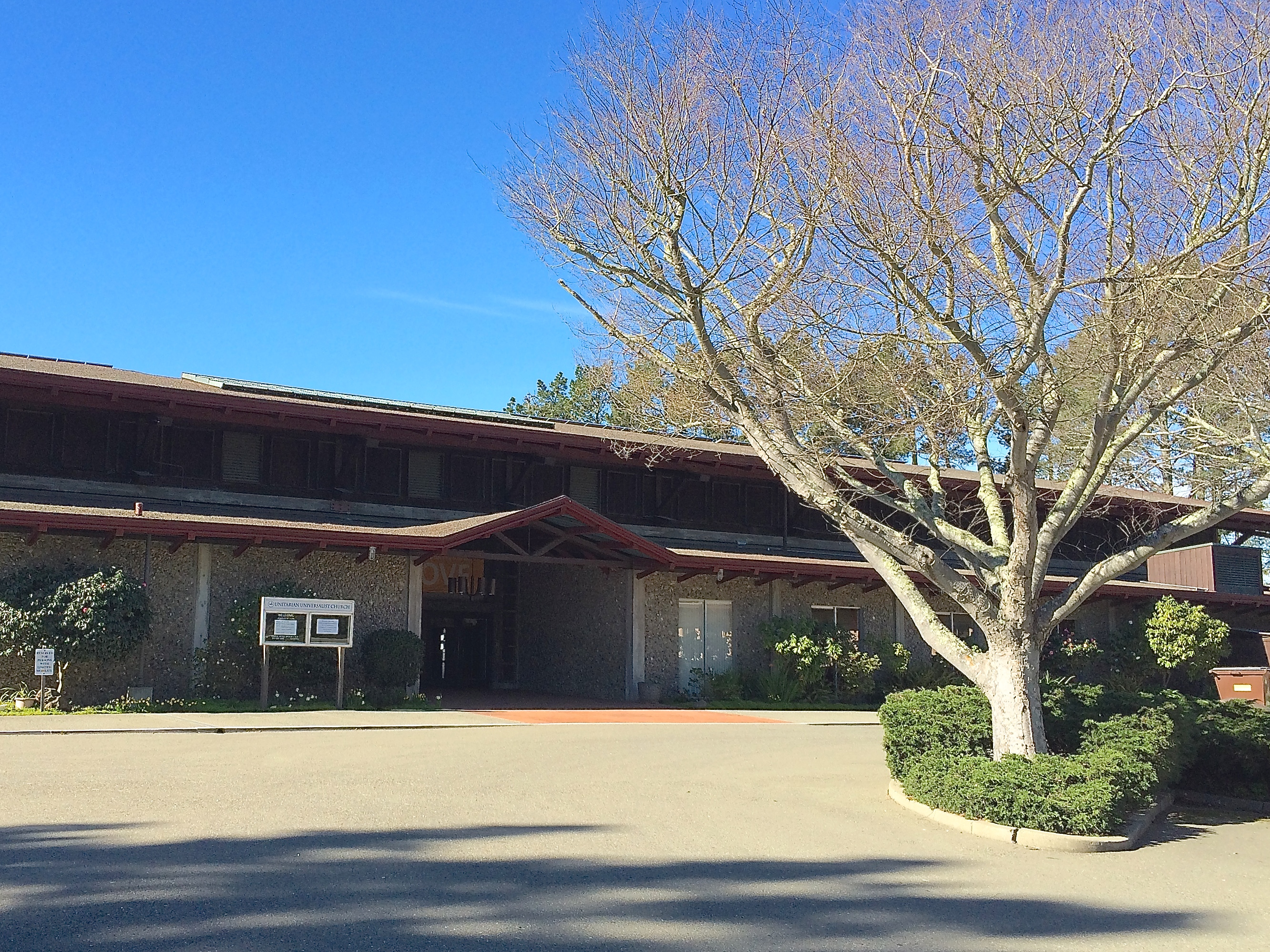
- Unitarian Universalist Church of Berkeley
- Location: Kensington, California
- Address: 1 Lawson Road Kensington, CA 94707
- Country: United States
- Denomination: Unitarian Universalist
- Website: uucb.org

History
- Founded: July 12, 1891

Specifications
- Capacity: 200 seated

The Unitarian Universalist Church of Berkeley (UUCB) was founded as the First Unitarian Church of Berkeley in Berkeley, California, in 1891 and moved to Kensington, California, in 1961. It is one of the oldest and largest Unitarian Universalist churches on the West Coast and has had many distinguished members, including numerous professors at the University of California, Berkeley. It is highly regarded for its music program as well as its series of renowned ministers and its many avenues for spiritual growth, learning, and social action.

== History ==
The First Unitarian Church of Berkeley was founded on July 12, 1891. (The name was changed to Unitarian Universalist Church of Berkeley in 1998.) Its first minister was Edward B. Payne. The church occupied rented quarters for several years, purchasing land for a building at Bancroft Way and Dana Street in 1893. Following a resolution by the Pacific Coast Unitarian Conference to establish a Unitarian divinity school, an ambitious design for the church and seminary was drawn by architect Joachim Mathisen. However, the Panic of 1893 intervened, and the seminary did not materialize until later, eventually becoming the Starr King School for the Ministry. A more modest design by A. C. Schweinfurth for the church alone was built in 1898. The redwood-shingled First Unitarian Church became a landmark of Bay Region "building with nature" architecture and still stands at the same location, now used as a dance studio on the University of California campus. It has been listed on the National Register of Historic Places (NRHP) since 1981.

Bernard Maybeck, another leading California Arts and Crafts architect, was a member of the church and designed its parish hall, built in 1909 (not extant). (He had been out of the country during the period when the Schweinfurth building was designed and built.) He also made sketches for a Mission Revival style building for the Pacific Unitarian School for the Ministry. In the mid 1950s, the elderly Maybeck was also the owner of a tract of land in Kensington, an unincorporated area of the Berkeley Hills, which he sold at a discount to the church when it had outgrown its old building and the university had taken the property through eminent domain. A new church building on the Kensington site was designed by Wurster, Bernardi & Emmons with Theodore Bernardi as lead architect. Bernardi was a great admirer of Maybeck and said Maybeck's work influenced his church design. Geraldine Knight Scott was the landscape architect. The congregation began using the main building in 1961; two religious education classroom buildings were added soon thereafter.

During the planning for the move to Kensington, a segment of the congregation, dissatisfied with the move and the leadership of the Rev. J. Raymond Cope, decided to remain in Berkeley proper. They formed the Berkeley Fellowship of Unitarian Universalists, which still exists at Cedar and Bonita Streets.

== Loyalty oath resistance ==
In 1950, Harold Levering, a California assemblyman from Bel Air, proposed an amendment to the state constitution that would require all religious institutions to sign a loyalty oath or lose their tax-exempt status. The demand for a loyalty oath already applied to all public employees of the state through the Levering Act, but this was the first time in the history of the United States that a government imposed such an oath on a religious group. It was passed into the California state constitution by popular vote in 1952. Religious institutions had until March 1954 to decide whether or not they would comply. Most churches signed the oath, but the First Unitarian Church of Berkeley, led by Rev. J. Raymond Cope, joined the First Unitarian Church of Los Angeles and a few other congregations (Unitarians, Methodists, and Quakers) in refusing to sign. Their tax-exempt status was revoked, but in 1958 the U.S. Supreme Court declared the Levering oath unconstitutional, and taxes that had been paid were refunded.

== Music ==
Under the direction of Dr. Bryan Baker, the church continues a tradition of fine music production. Vocal music is performed by "Luminescence" (the main choir), a Youth and Children's Choir, and other ensembles. An Aeolian-Skinner organ, three grand pianos (Yamaha, Chickering and Baldwin), a harpsichord, and a gamelan are among the many musical instruments featured in church services and special events. The church is the home of the Kensington Symphony Orchestra and is frequently used for musical recordings because of its excellent acoustics. André Watts gave piano recitals at the church in the early 1990s, two of which were recorded on the EMI label. A sing-along performance of Handel's Messiah has been a December tradition since 1966.

== Advocacy and social action ==
The congregation has a strong commitment to social justice and a history of progressive actions to foster human rights, world peace, and humane living conditions for all. Ongoing projects include both financial and volunteer support of the Greater Richmond Interfaith Project and its family shelter, a partner Unitarian church and village in the Transylvania region of Romania, the Unitarian Universalist Justice Ministry California, the Unitarian Universalist Service Committee, and numerous other organizations.

== Publications ==
- In 1898 the Women's Auxiliary of the First Unitarian Church of Berkeley published A Berkeley Year: A Sheaf of Nature Essays, edited by Eva V. Carlin, which includes writings by members Charles Keeler, Joseph Le Conte, Willis Jepson, and others, with ornamentation by Louise Keeler.(OCLC 4948044)
- Natural Versus Supernatural, or A Man as a Unified Whole and as Part of Nature as a Unified Whole, by William Emerson Ritter, 38 pp., 1933. (OCLC 14525907)
- What Does a Sermon Do, by Rev. Richard F. Boeke with an introduction by Huston Smith, 32 pp., 1974. (OCLC 2505586)
- The First Unitarian Church of Berkeley: A History, a 23-page booklet by Merv Hasselmann, was printed in 1981 for the church's 90th anniversary. (OCLC 8354855)
- Co-minister Barbara Hamilton-Holway authored three books as a resource for small group ministry in Unitarian Universalist churches: Evensong: An Eight-Week Series of Gatherings, (1999, ISBN 9781558963870), Evensong, Volume Two (2002, ISBN 9781558964266), and Evensong for Families (2006, ISBN 978-1558965133). She also wrote Who Will Remember Me? A Daughter's Memoir of Grief and Recovery (2004, ISBN 9781558964600). Co-minister Bill Hamilton-Holway is co-author of Gatherings: Small Group Ministry for Men (2006, ISBN 978-1558965140).

== Called ministers at UUCB ==
- Edward B. Payne, 1892–1897, formerly minister of First Congregational Church of Berkeley and subsequently founder of Utopian community Altruria and spiritualist
- William B. Geoghegan, 1897–1899, formerly and later of First Unitarian Church in New Bedford, Mass.
- Frederick L. Hosmer, 1900–1904, writer of many hymns
- John Howland Lathrop, 1905–1911
- Arthur Maxson Smith, 1911–1915
- Harold E.B. Speight, 1915–1921, Field Director of American Red Cross
- Robert French Leavens, 1922–1925, compiler of Great Companions: Readings on the Meaning and Conduct of Life from Ancient and Modern Sources, 1927 (OCLC 1360662)
- Eldred C. Vanderlaan, 1925–1932, a signer of the Humanist Manifesto, 1933
- Horace Westwood, 1934–1945
- J. Raymond Cope, 1946–1968
- Howard W. Oliver, 1969–1972, later executive director of American Federation of Television and Radio Artists
- Richard F. Boeke, 1973–1994
- Barbara and Bill Hamilton-Holway, 1996–2014
- Christopher (Craethnenn) Holton Jablonski, Minister of Religious Education, 2005–2011
- Christian Schmidt and Kristin Grassel Schmidt, 2016–2020
- Rev. Dr. Michelle Collins, Interim Minister, 2020–2023
- Rev. Marcus Liefert, since August 2023

== Some notable past members ==
- Kinsey Anderson
- Marian Diamond
- Joseph Fabry
- Lucile W. Green
- Charles Keeler
- Joseph Le Conte
- Bernard Loomer
- Bernard Maybeck
- Aurelia Henry Reinhardt
- Malvina Reynolds
- William Emerson Ritter
- Charles Seeger
- Frederick C. Torrey
- Earl Morse Wilbur

== Some notable past guest speakers ==
- Ysaye Barnwell
- Robert Bellah
- Forrest Church
- Daniel Ellsberg
- Viktor Frankl
- Johan Galtung
- Van Jones
- Jack Kornfield
- George Lakoff
- Rabbi Michael Lerner
- Holly Near
- Linus Pauling
- Imam Feisal Abdul Rauf
- Rosemary Radford Ruether
- William F. Schulz
- Huston Smith
- Howard Thurman
- Tim Wise
