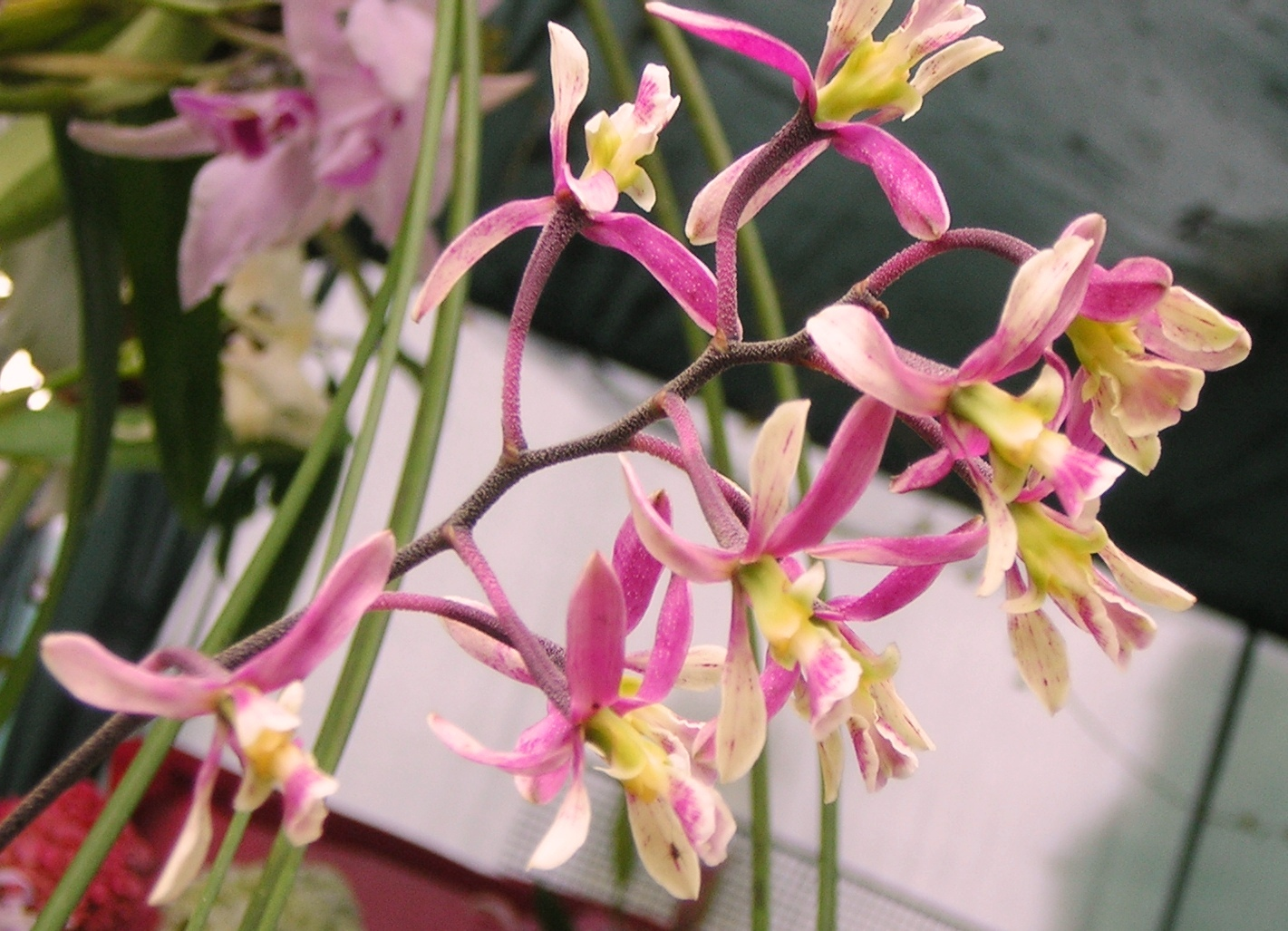

Conservation status
- CITES Appendix II

Scientific classification
- Kingdom: Plantae
- Clade: Tracheophytes
- Clade: Angiosperms
- Clade: Monocots
- Order: Asparagales
- Family: Orchidaceae
- Subfamily: Epidendroideae
- Genus: Encyclia
- Species: E. cyperifolia

Binomial name
- Encyclia cyperifolia (C.Schweinf.) Carnevali & I.Ramírez

Synonyms
- Bletia ensiformis Ruiz & Pav.; Epidendrum microtos var. grandiflorum C.Schweinf.; Encyclia microtos var. grandiflora (C.Schweinf.) Hoehne; Epidendrum cyperifolium C.Schweinf.

= Encyclia cyperifolia =

Species of orchid

Encyclia cyperifolia is a species of orchid found in South America.
