= Sara Peters Grozelier =

American painter

Sara Peters Grozelier (1821–1907) was an American painter of portrait miniatures. Her name is sometimes given as Sarah.

Little is known of Grozelier's life and career. She was born in Andover, Massachusetts, the youngest of the twelve children of John and Elizabeth Davis Peters; her elder sister was the miniaturist Clarissa Peters Russell, whose husband Moses was also a miniaturist. She graduated from Andover's Abbott Academy, where she learned painting and drawing, in 1836, and spent the next few years painting miniature portraits of prominent locals before moving to Boston at the age of twenty-six. In 1855 she married the French-born Leopold Grozelier, a portraitist and lithographer. In that year she showed three miniatures at the Boston Athenaeum. The following year she showed another, at the Brooklyn Art Association, under the sobriquet "Madam Grozelier". In 1866, after her husband's death, she was listed in the Boston directory; she was listed there again between 1877 and 1883. She also produced lithographs, and after her husband's death supported herself by painting over photographs in oil or pastel. At sixty-one she returned to North Andover. The Grozeliers had no children.

Grozelier and her husband are buried at the Ridgewood Cemetery in Andover. A portrait of two girls by her is in the collection of the Metropolitan Museum of Art; the date of the watercolor-on-ivory painting is unknown. A self-portrait, dated to between 1845 and 1855, is currently owned by the North Andover Historical Society.
