= Burnham Athenaeum =

- U.S. National Register of Historic Places
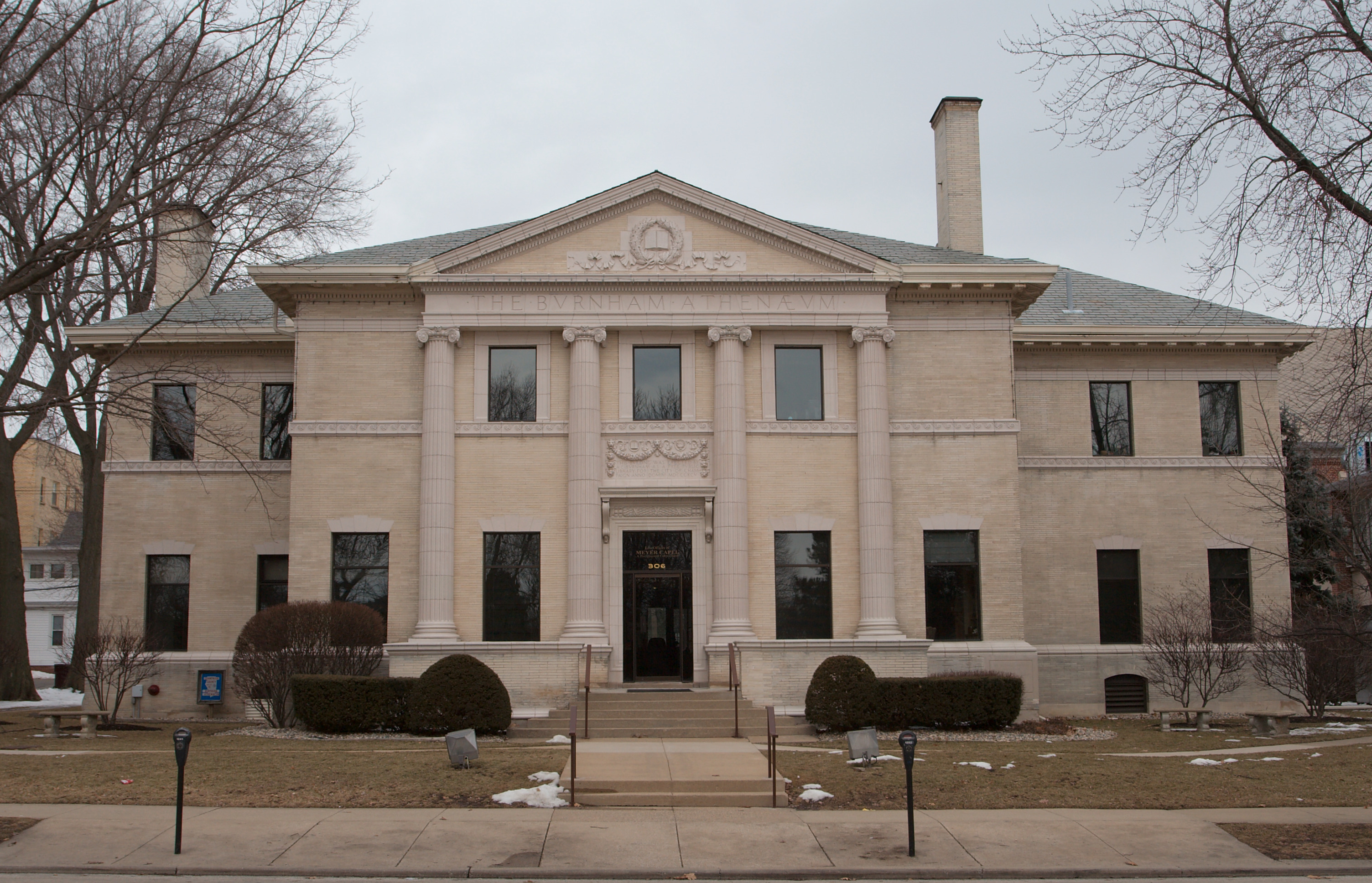

- Location within Illinois Location within the United States
- Location: 306 W. Church St., Champaign, Illinois
- Coordinates: 40°7′7″N 88°14′50″W
- Area: 1 acre (0.40 ha)
- Built: 1896
- Architect: Julius A. Schweinfurth
- Architectural style: Classical Revival
- NRHP reference No.: 78001115
- Added to NRHP: June 7, 1978

The Burnham Athenaeum, also known as the Champaign Public Library, is a historic library building located at 306 W. Church St. in Champaign, Illinois. Built in 1896 through a donation from Albert C. Burnham, the building was Champaign's first permanent library. Architect Julius A. Schweinfurth designed the Classical Revival building. The two-story building is built from cream-colored brick with terra cotta ornamentation. The front entrance features four two-story Ionic columns supporting a pediment and an inscribed frieze. A terra cotta band encircles the building below the second-story window sill line. The Champaign Public Library occupied the building until 1978, when it moved to a larger facility.

The building was added to the National Register of Historic Places on June 7, 1978.
