= First Unitarian Church (Berkeley, California) =

Church building in California, US

- U.S. National Register of Historic Places
- Berkeley Landmark
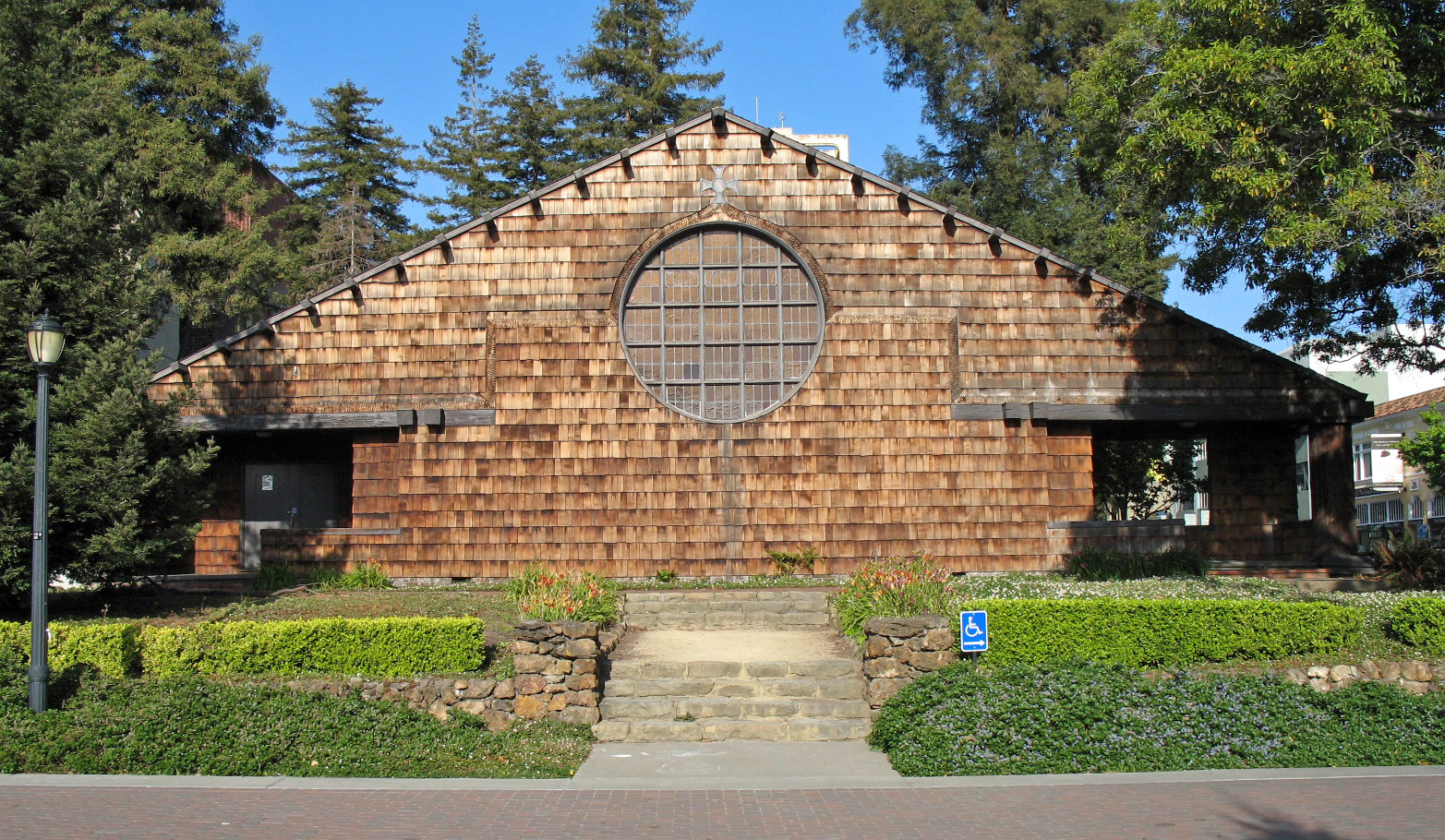
- Location: 2401 Bancroft Way, Berkeley, California
- Coordinates: 37°52′7″N 122°15′36″W
- Area: 0.2 acres (0.081 ha)
- Built: 1898
- Architect: A. C. Schweinfurth
- Architectural style: Shingle Style, Bay Area Tradition
- NRHP reference No.: 81000143
- BERKL No.: 48

Significant dates
- Added to NRHP: December 10, 1981
- Designated BERKL: November 16, 1981

The First Unitarian Church in Berkeley, California is a former church building that was built in 1898. It was designed by Albert C. Schweinfurth, who made unconventional use of Shingle Style architecture, usually applied to homes, in designing a church. It was also highly unusual for a church building in several other ways, including the use of industrial-style metal sash windows, sections of redwood tree trunks as pillars, the strong horizontal emphasis, and a semicircular apse with a conical roof. The building is listed on the National Register of Historic Places, the California State Historic Resources Survey, and is a City of Berkeley Landmark. It has also been known as University Dance Studio and Bancroft Dance Studio for its current use.

Although originally outside the university grounds, it is now the second oldest building still standing on the Berkeley campus. At the time it was built, facing a block of Dana Street that no longer exists, it joined a cluster of Protestant churches that had been built since the 1870s with the encouragement of the university administration. The land was acquired by the university in 1960 through eminent domain for the construction of a student union complex.

The church was the first meeting place of the Hillside Club, formed in 1898 to promote Arts and Crafts movement principles in the growing university town.

When it was built, A. C. Schweinfurth, the architect, was well on his way to an eminent career with the patronage of the Hearst family, but this church ended up being his last project. While it was under construction, he began a two-year European tour with his wife and daughter. He came down with typhoid fever and died in September 1900.

In 1908 the congregation built an adjacent building called Unity Hall, designed by member Bernard Maybeck, which was demolished in 1965 for the construction of Zellerbach Hall. The Schweinfurth-designed building was preserved, landmarked, and restored with seismic upgrades and new shingles in 1999.

== See also ==
- Unitarian Universalist Church of Berkeley
