= Joseph Whiting Stock =

American painter (1815–1855)

- Born: January 30, 1815; Springfield, Massachusetts, U.S.
- Died: 1855 (aged 39–40); Springfield, Massachusetts, U.S.
- Known for: Painter

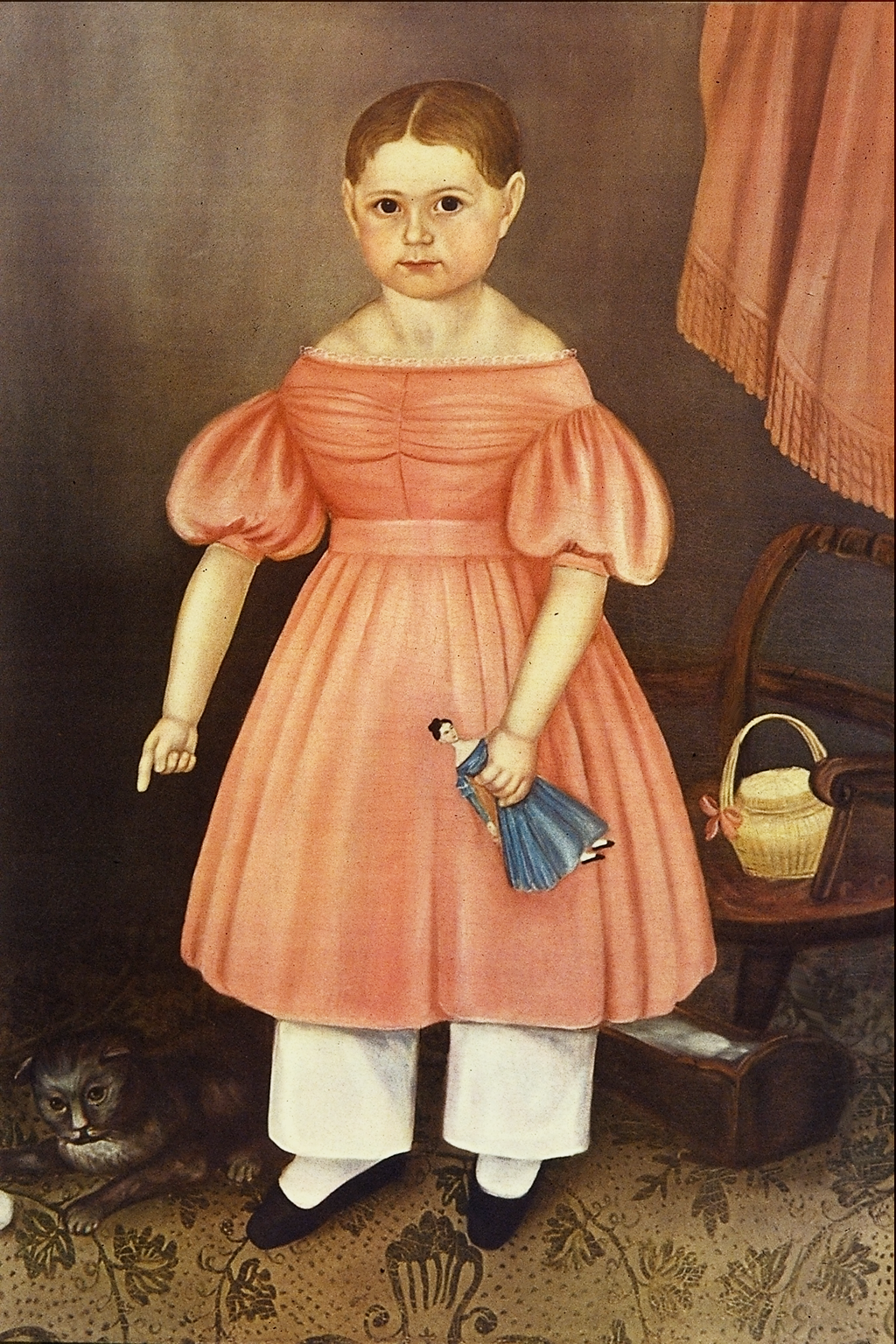
Mary Jane Smith by Joseph Whiting Stock

Joseph Whiting Stock (January 30, 1815 – 1855) was an American painter known for his portraits, miniatures, and landscape paintings, many of which he did on commission. He was born on January 30, 1815, in Springfield, Massachusetts.

When Stock was eleven years old, an oxcart fell on him, causing him to spend the rest of his life as a paraplegic. After this accident, he began to study painting under Franklin White, a pupil of the painter Chester Harding, on the advice of his physician, and was commissioned to do a series of anatomical drawings by Dr. James Swan in 1834. That year, Dr. Swan constructed a wheelchair that enabled Stock to paint large canvasses and be lifted on trains so as to travel for commissions. For the next two decades, Stock accepted commissions for portraits around New England, working in Warren and Bristol, Rhode Island; New Bedford, Massachusetts; and Middletown, Goshen, and Port Jervis, New York. His studios were located in his hometown of Springfield throughout this time.

In 1855, Stock died of tuberculosis in Springfield. He was forty years old.

Stock's paintings are sometimes confused with those of Clarissa Peters Russell, the miniaturist, as her style is similar to his and her work tends to be unsigned.
