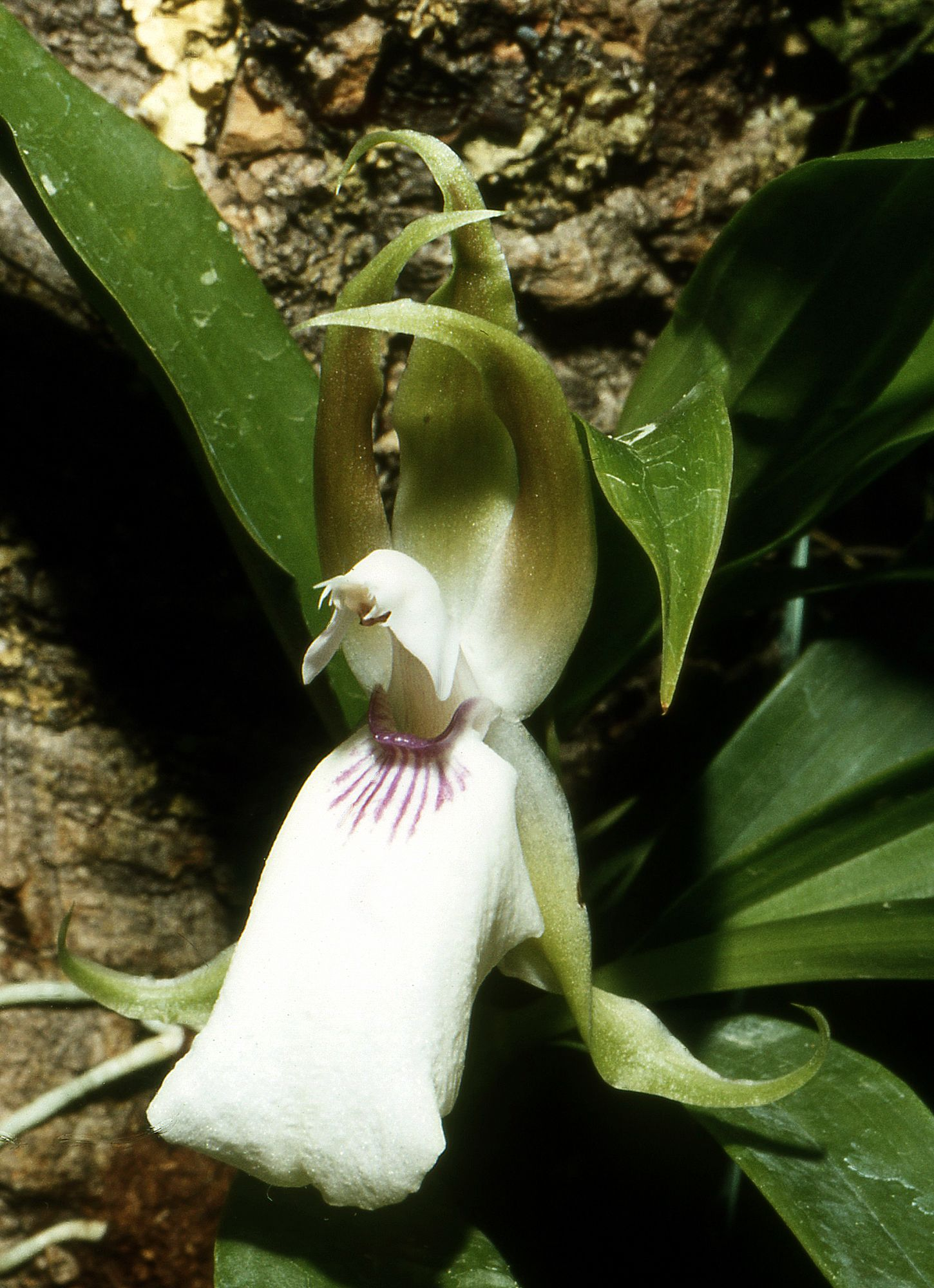
- Zygosepalum labiosum

Scientific classification
- Kingdom: Plantae
- Clade: Tracheophytes
- Clade: Angiosperms
- Clade: Monocots
- Order: Asparagales
- Family: Orchidaceae
- Subfamily: Epidendroideae
- Tribe: Cymbidieae
- Subtribe: Zygopetalinae
- Genus: Zygosepalum (Rchb.f.) Rchb.f.

= Zygosepalum =

Genus of orchids

Zygosepalum is a genus of flowering plants from the orchid family, Orchidaceae.

== Species ==
Species accepted by the Plants of the World Online as of 2022:

- Zygosepalum angustilabium (C.Schweinf.) Garay
- Zygosepalum ballii (Rolfe) Garay
- Zygosepalum kegelii (Rchb.f.) Rchb.f.
- Zygosepalum labiosum (Rich.) C.Schweinf.
- Zygosepalum lindeniae (Rolfe) Garay & Dunst.
- Zygosepalum marginatum Garay
- Zygosepalum revolutum Garay & G.A.Romero
- Zygosepalum tatei (Ames & C.Schweinf.) Garay & Dunst.

== See also ==
- List of Orchidaceae genera
