= Verona, California =

Unincorporated community in California, United States

Verona
- Unincorporated community
- Location in California Verona (the United States)
- Coordinates: 37°37′37″N 121°52′53″W
- Country: United States
- State: California
- County: Alameda
- Elevation: 315 ft (96 m)

Verona is an unincorporated community in Alameda County, California, United States. It is located on the Western Pacific Railroad (now the Union Pacific's Oakland Subdivision) and the Southern Pacific Railroad, (now the Niles Canyon Railway) 2.25 miles (3.6 km) north of Sunol, at an elevation of 315 feet (96 m).

== Name ==
The name is from the estate of Phoebe Hearst La Hacienda del Pozo de Verona which was located nearby and the station at Verona was the nearest to the estate.

== Verona shelter ==
A small shelter named Verona was built in 1901. It served the local farmers in the area and had a nearby picnic area. The station was retired in March 1939.
