= Hacienda del Pozo de Verona =

19th century mansion in California, U.S.

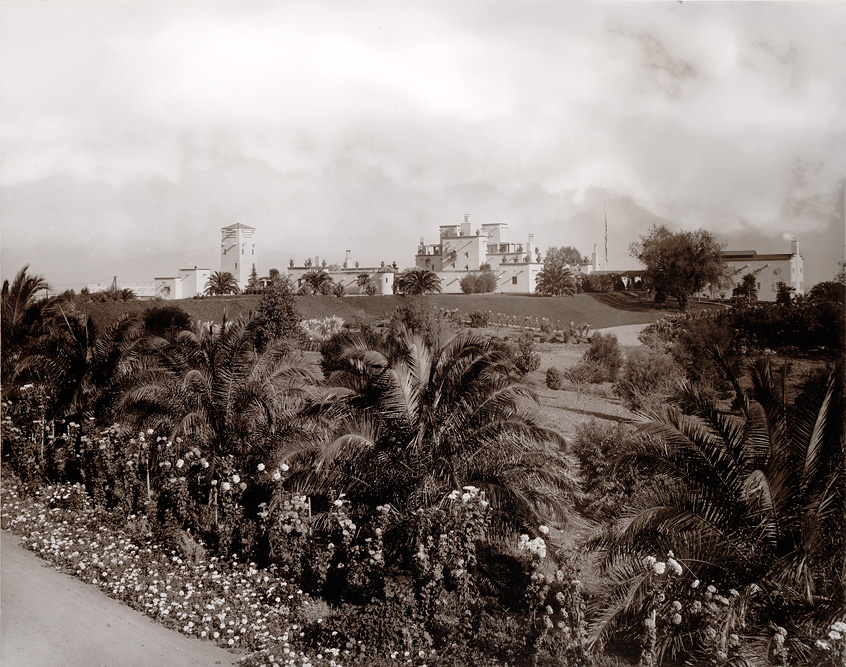

General information
- Architectural style: Mission Revival, Pueblo Revival, Moorish
- Location: Pleasanton, California, United States
- Coordinates: 37.6371°N 121.8949°W
- Construction started: 1894
- Completed: 1898
- Demolished: 1969

Design and construction
- Architects: A. C. Schweinfurth, Julia Morgan

The Hacienda del Pozo de Verona was a mansion designed by architect A. C. Schweinfurth for philanthropist Phoebe Hearst on part of the former Rancho Valle de San José in the Amador Valley near Pleasanton, California. The Hacienda was originally built between 1894 and 1898, with substantial later additions designed by architect Julia Morgan. The design of the Hacienda combined Mission, Pueblo, and Moorish architectural styles. It was destroyed by fire in 1969.

A railroad station named Hacienda (or Hearst) was built on the Western Pacific Railroad at Verona to serve the estate.

The property was acquired by a group of businessmen in 1924 and it became the original home of the Castlewood Country Club. It burned down in 1969.

The community of Castlewood, California formed from houses around the club. Alameda County created the Castlewood County Service Area in 1968. It currently provides road maintenance, water, and sewer services to the community.

== See also ==
- List of works by Julia Morgan
