= Moreland Street Historic District =

Historic district in Massachusetts, United States

- U.S. National Register of Historic Places
- U.S. Historic district
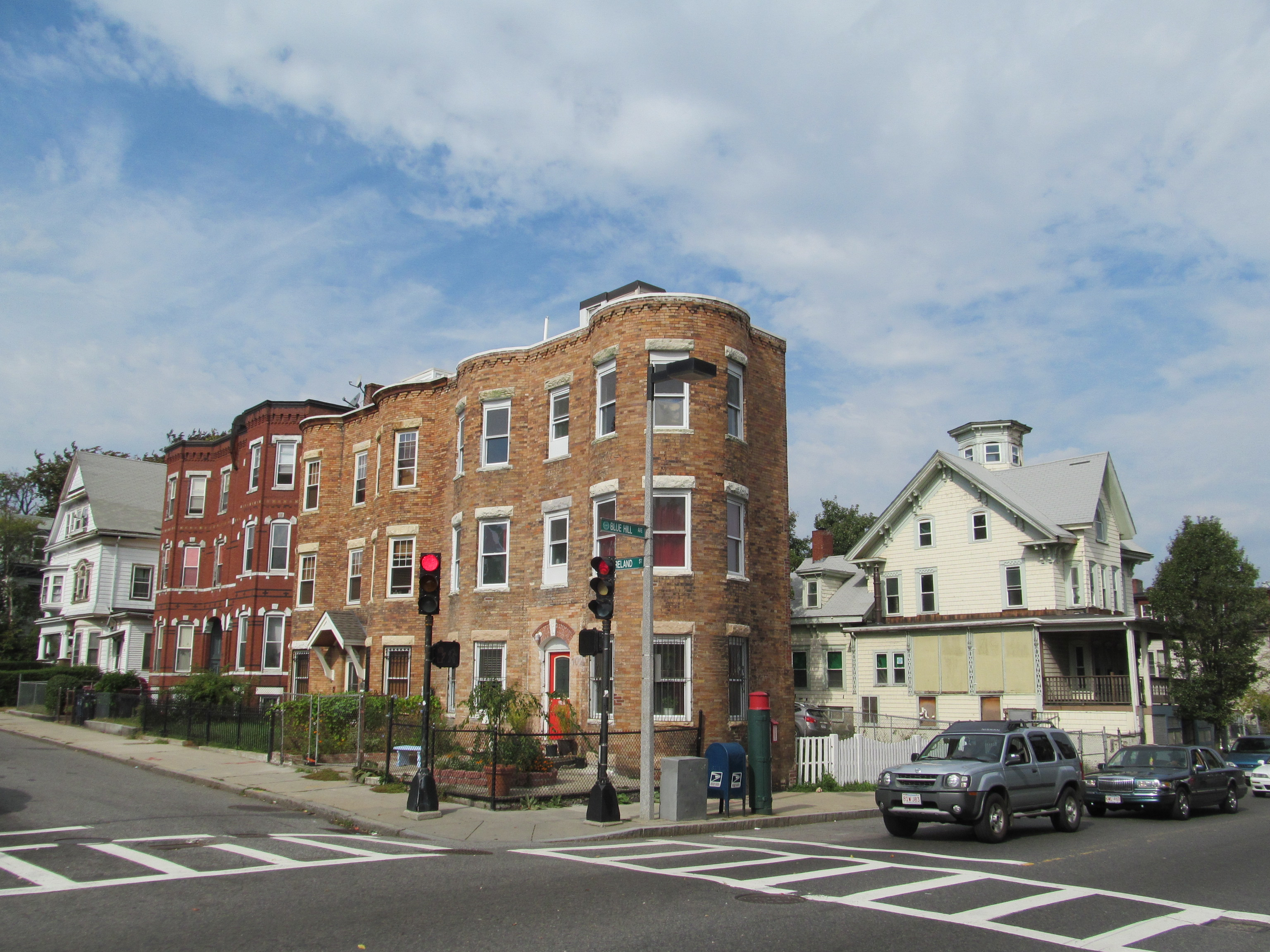
- Moreland Street and Blue Hill Avenue

- Location within Massachusetts Location within the United States
- Location: Boston, Massachusetts
- Coordinates: 42°19′25″N 71°4′48″W
- Area: 63 acres (25 ha)
- Built: 1850
- Architect: Bradlee, N.J.; Besarick, J.H., et al.
- Architectural style: Second Empire, Italianate, Queen Anne
- NRHP reference No.: 84002890
- Added to NRHP: March 29, 1984

The Moreland Street Historic District is a historic district roughly bounded by Kearsarge, Blue Hill Avenues, and Warren, Waverly, and Winthrop Streets in the Roxbury neighborhood of Boston, Massachusetts. It encompasses 63 acres (25 ha) of predominantly residential urban streetscape, which was developed between about 1840 and 1920. Housing types represent a cross-section of architectural styles from the period, including Second Empire, Italianate, and Queen Anne style. It is a fairly well-preserved grouping in an area where many sections have been negatively affected by urban blight and redevelopment. One notable house is at 130 Warren Street: it is the only house in the district built out of Roxbury puddingstone. That building is currently under study as a pending landmark for the Boston Landmarks Commission.

The district was listed on the National Register of Historic Places in 1984.

== See also ==
- National Register of Historic Places listings in southern Boston, Massachusetts
