= Julius A. Schweinfurth =

American architect, artist, and designer (1858–1931)

Julius Adolphe Schweinfurth FAIA
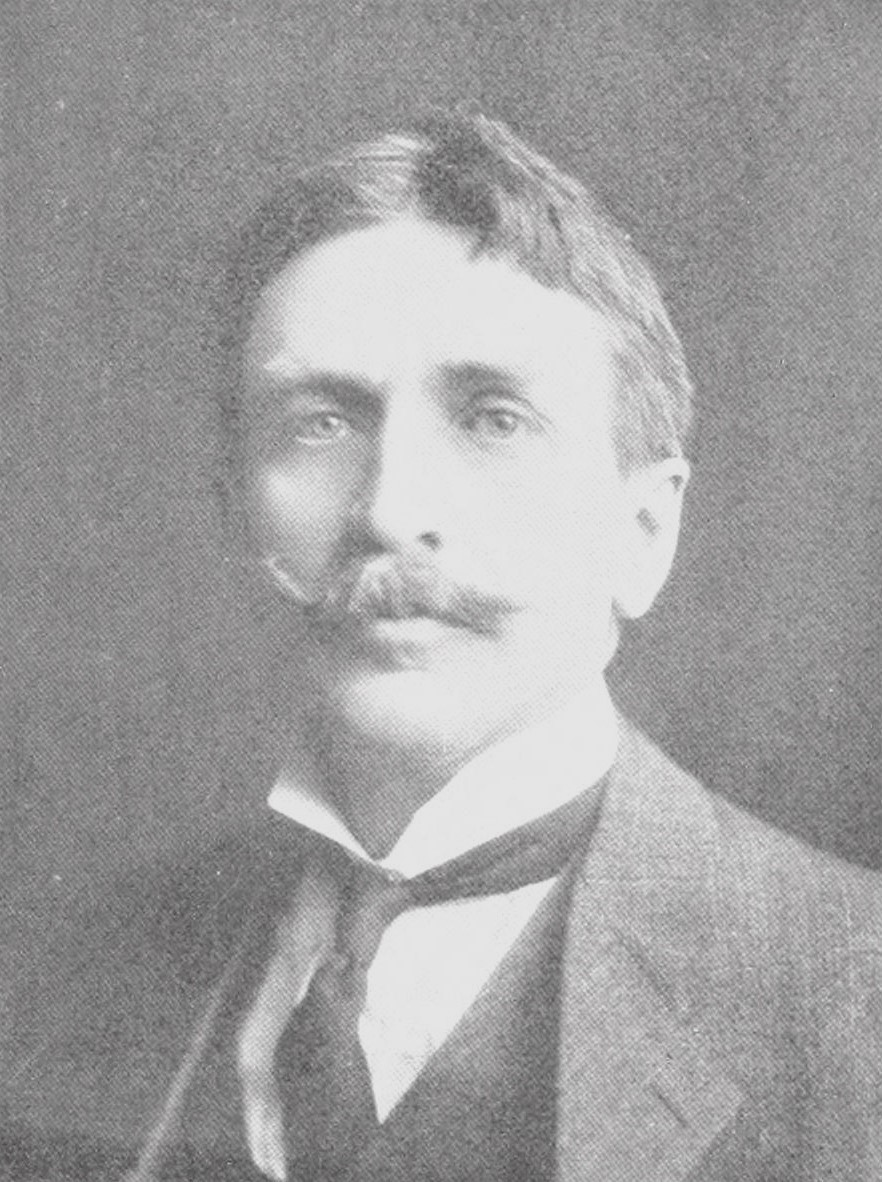
- Born: September 20, 1858; Auburn, New York
- Died: September 29, 1931 (aged 73); Wellesley, Massachusetts
- Occupation: Architect
- Spouse: Fannie Bellows (m. 1889)
- Children: Charles Schweinfurth
- Buildings: Bradley Mortuary Chapel; Champaign Public Library; Sarah J. Baker School
- Burial place: Walnut Hills Cemetery
- Relatives: A. C. Schweinfurth (brother); Charles F. Schweinfurth (brother); Georg August Schweinfurth (grandfather)

Julius Adolphe Schweinfurth (September 20, 1858 – September 29, 1931) was an American architect, artist, and designer.

== Biography ==
Julius Adolphe Schweinfurth was born September 20, 1858, in Auburn, New York to German immigrants Charles J. Schweinfurth and Katherine Ammon. His brothers A. C. Schweinfurth and Charles F. Schweinfurth were also architects and his grandfather was Georg August Schweinfurth was a botanist and African explorer. Schweinfurth's father was an engineer and studied at the Stuttgart Polytechnic Institute before immigrating to America in the 1850s.

Schweinfurth attended Auburn Academic High School and graduated in 1876. Afterwards, Schweinfurth moved to Boston, Massachusetts in 1879 and worked for the architectural firm of Peabody and Stearns.

In 1883, Schweinfurth partnered with his brother Charles in Cleveland, Ohio. The two remained partners until 1885 when Schweinfurth left to tour Europe for nine months. He studied in England, Spain, Italy, and France in addition to museums such as the South Kingston Museum in London. Upon his return to the United States in 1886, Schweinfurth rejoined Peabody and Stearns as chief designer. A year later, he published a collection of his work from Europe titled Sketches Abroad.

In 1895, Schweinfurth left Peabody and Stearns to start his own practice. His private practice lasted 33 years until he retired in 1928. He designed over 70 buildings during this period. He also entered numerous design competitions such as for the American Fine Arts Society (1891), the Minnesota Statehouse (1895), and the Boston Athenæum (1902).

In addition to his architectural work, Schweinfurth was a skilled graphic designer, drawer, and watercolorist. He designed a cover for Francis Parkman's The Oregon Trail.

In 1925, Schweinfurth was elected Fellow of the American Institute of Architects. He was also active in the Boston Society of Architects.

== Family and death ==
In 1889, Schweinfurth married Fannie Bellows of Boston. In 1890, Charles Schweinfurth, their son and only child, was born. Schweinfurth died September 29, 1931, at his home in Wellesley, Massachusetts. He was buried at Walnut Hills Cemetery in Brookline, Massachusetts.

Schweinfurth founded the Schweinfurth Art Center in Auburn, New York. Northeastern University now holds the primary collection of Schweinfurth's work.

== Selected works ==
- Bradley Mortuary Chapel at Fort Hill Cemetery (1893), Auburn, New York
- Mary Hutcheson Page residence (1893), 21 Hawthorn Rd., Brookline, Massachusetts
- Saint Paul's Church Parish House (1895), Brookline, Massachusetts
- Champaign Public Library (1896), Champaign, Illinois
- John Hancock memorial marker in Old Granary Burying Ground (1896), Boston, Massachusetts
- Christ Chapel at George Junior Republic (1900), Freeville, New York — Now on the campus of William George Agency
- Pierce Grammar School (1901), 32 Pierce St., Brookline, Massachusetts
- Police Station and Municipal Court Building (c. 1901), Brookline, Massachusetts
- Wellesley College residential dormitory quadrangle (1903), Wellesley, Massachusetts
  - Beebe Hall (1908), Cazenove Hall (1905), Pomeroy Hall (1904), Shafer Hall (1909), Wilder Hall (1899)
- Sarah J. Baker School (1905), Boston, Massachusetts
- Baptist Church (1908), Brookline, Massachusetts
- Ridgewood Cemetery entrance gate (1909), North Andover, Massachusetts
- Tod Homestead Cemetery Gate (1909), Belmont Ave., Youngstown, Ohio — Listed on the NRHP
- High School of Practical Arts (1912), Greenville St., Roxbury, Massachusetts — Was home of Girls' High School from 1954 to 1974
- Quincy E. Dickerman School (1915), 206 Magnolia St., Dorchester, Massachusetts
- Thomas Gardner School (1915), 30 Athol St., Allston, Massachusetts — Now the Gardner Pilot Academy

== Gallery ==
=== Architectural works ===
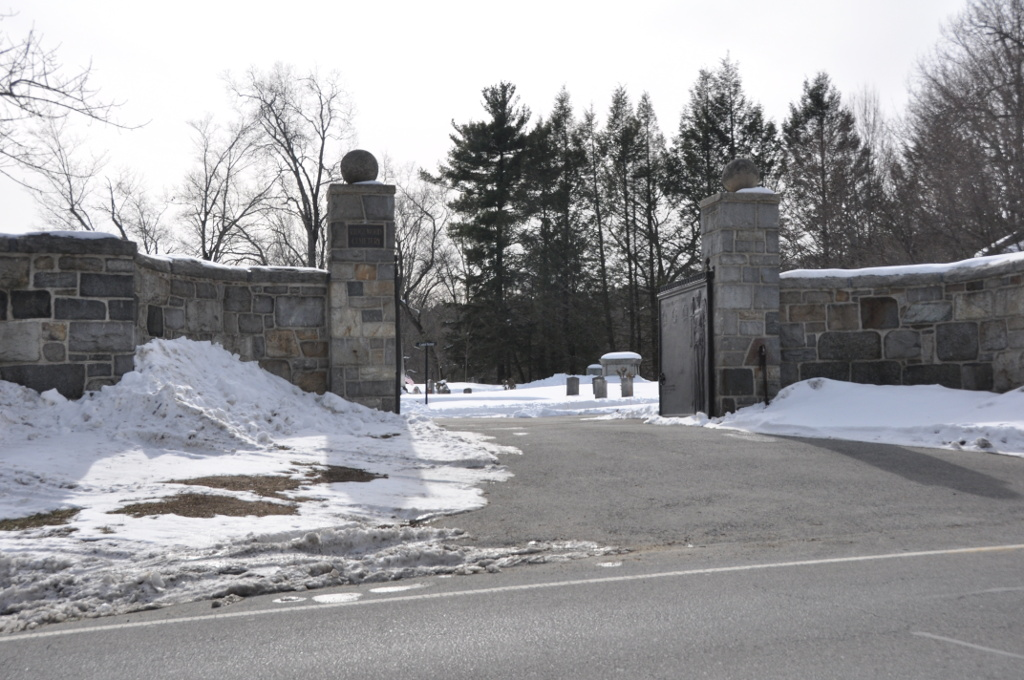
Entrance gate to Ridgewood Cemetery, North Andover, Massachusetts

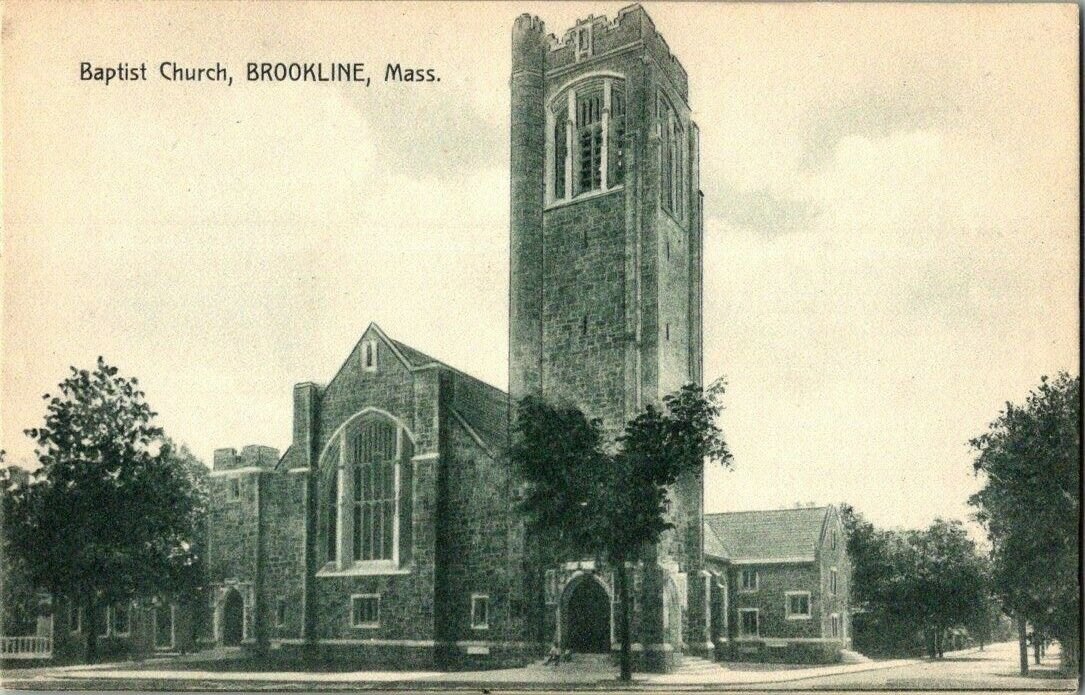
Baptist Church, Brookline, Massachusetts

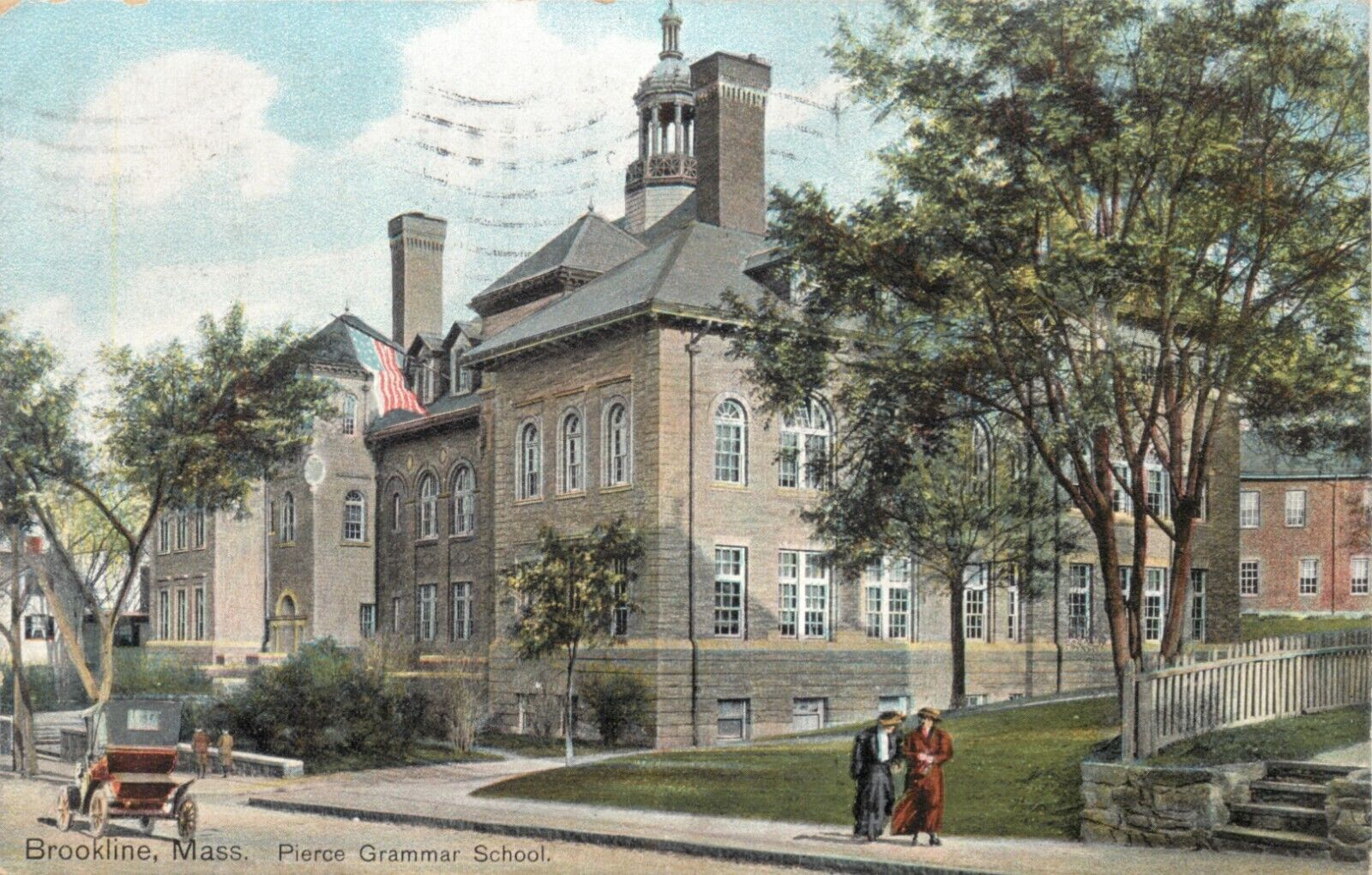
Pierce Grammar School, Brookline, Massachusetts

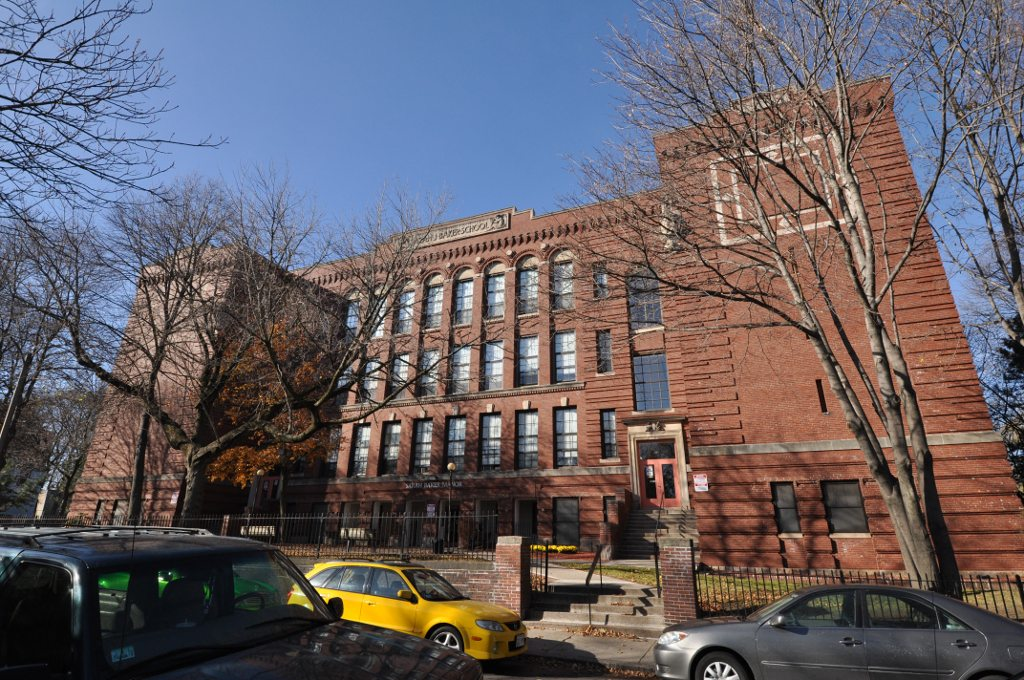
Sarah J. Baker School, Boston, Massachusetts

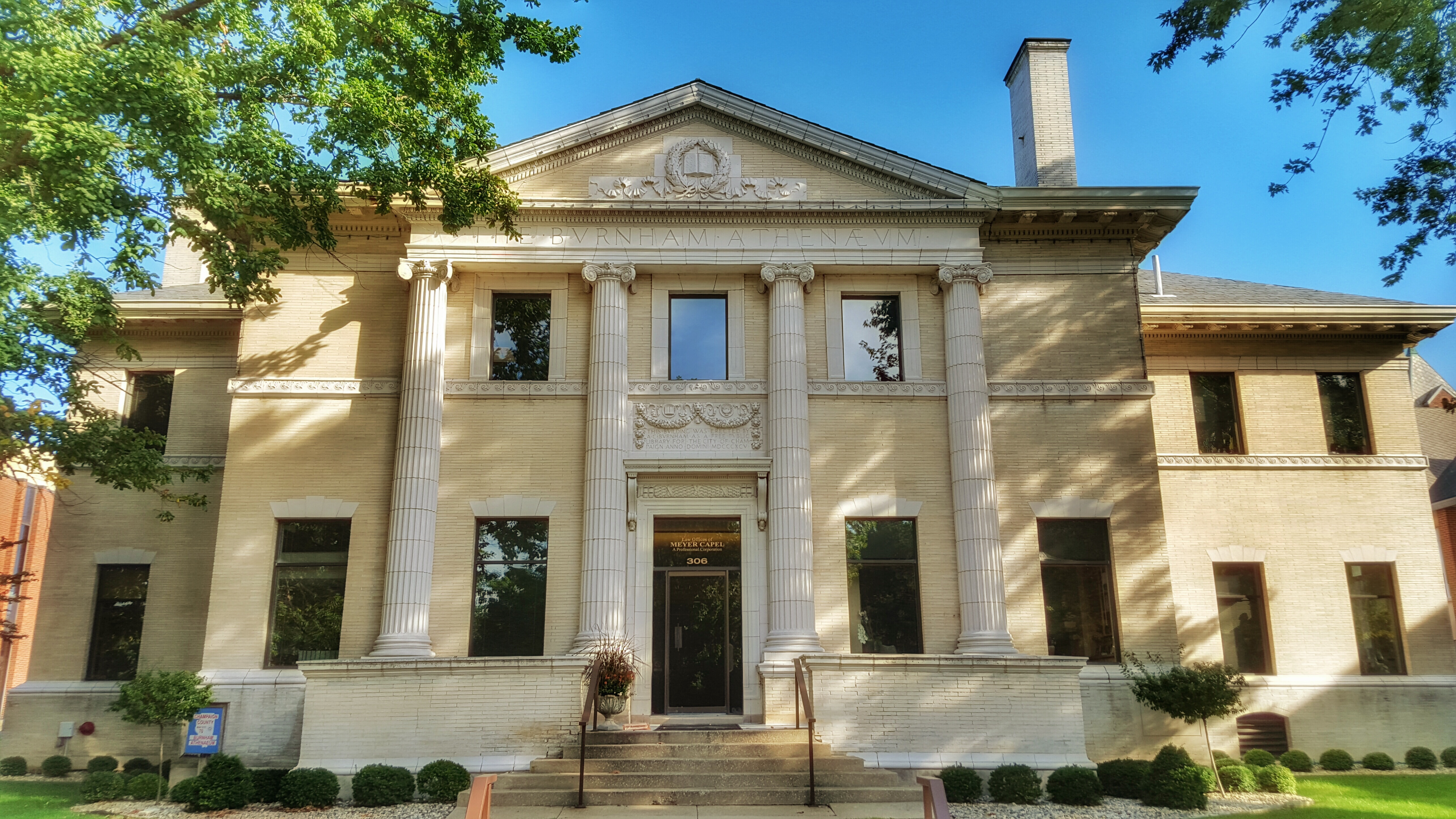
Champaign Public Library, Champaign, Illinois

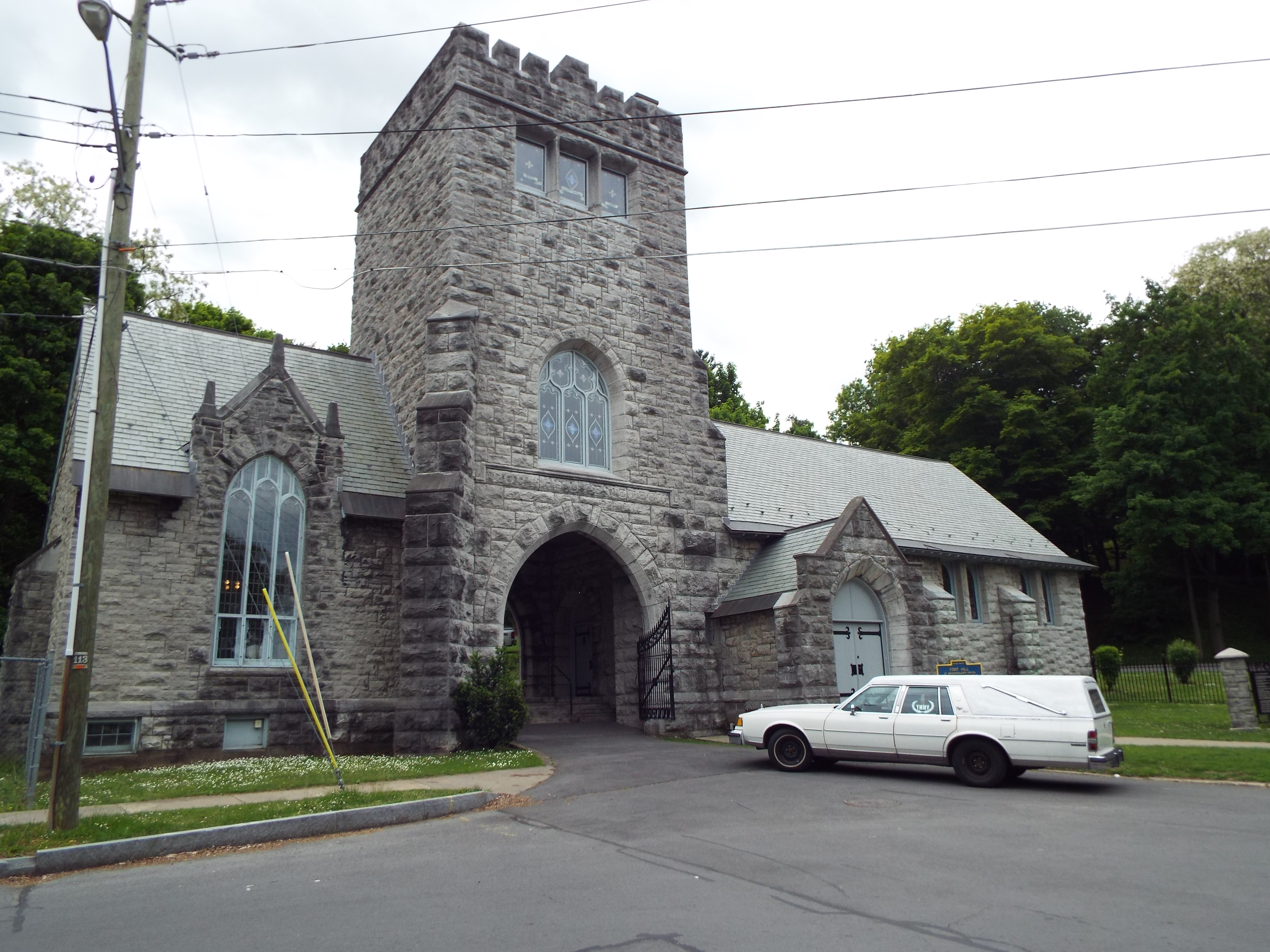
Bradley Mortuary Chapel at Fort Hill Cemetery, Auburn, New York

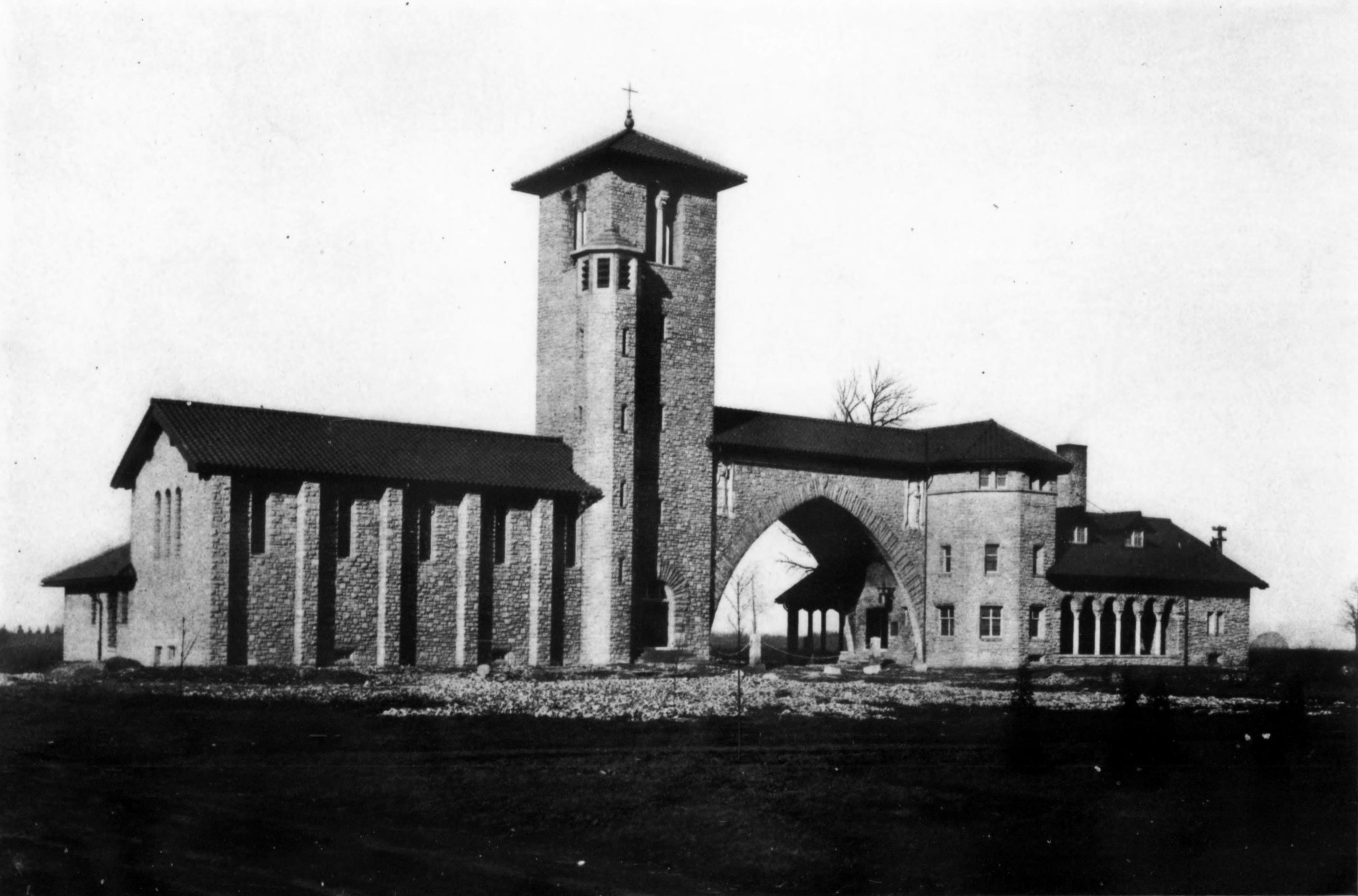
Tod Homestead Cemetery Gate, Youngstown, Ohio

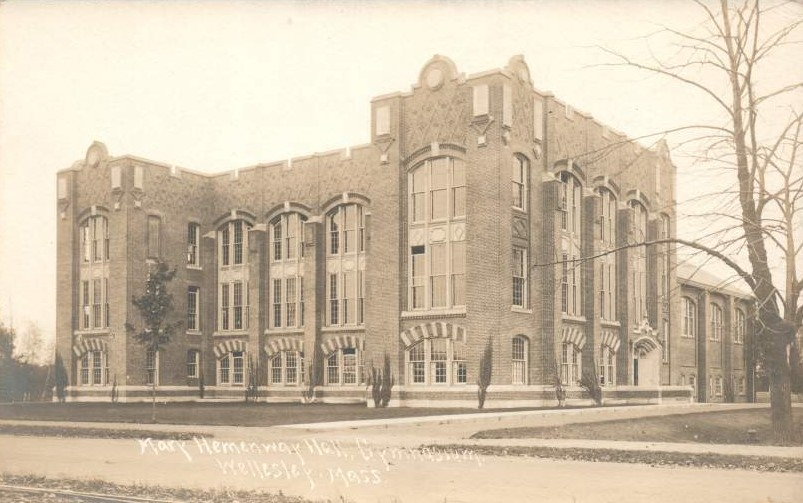
Hemenway Hall Gymnasium, Wellesley College

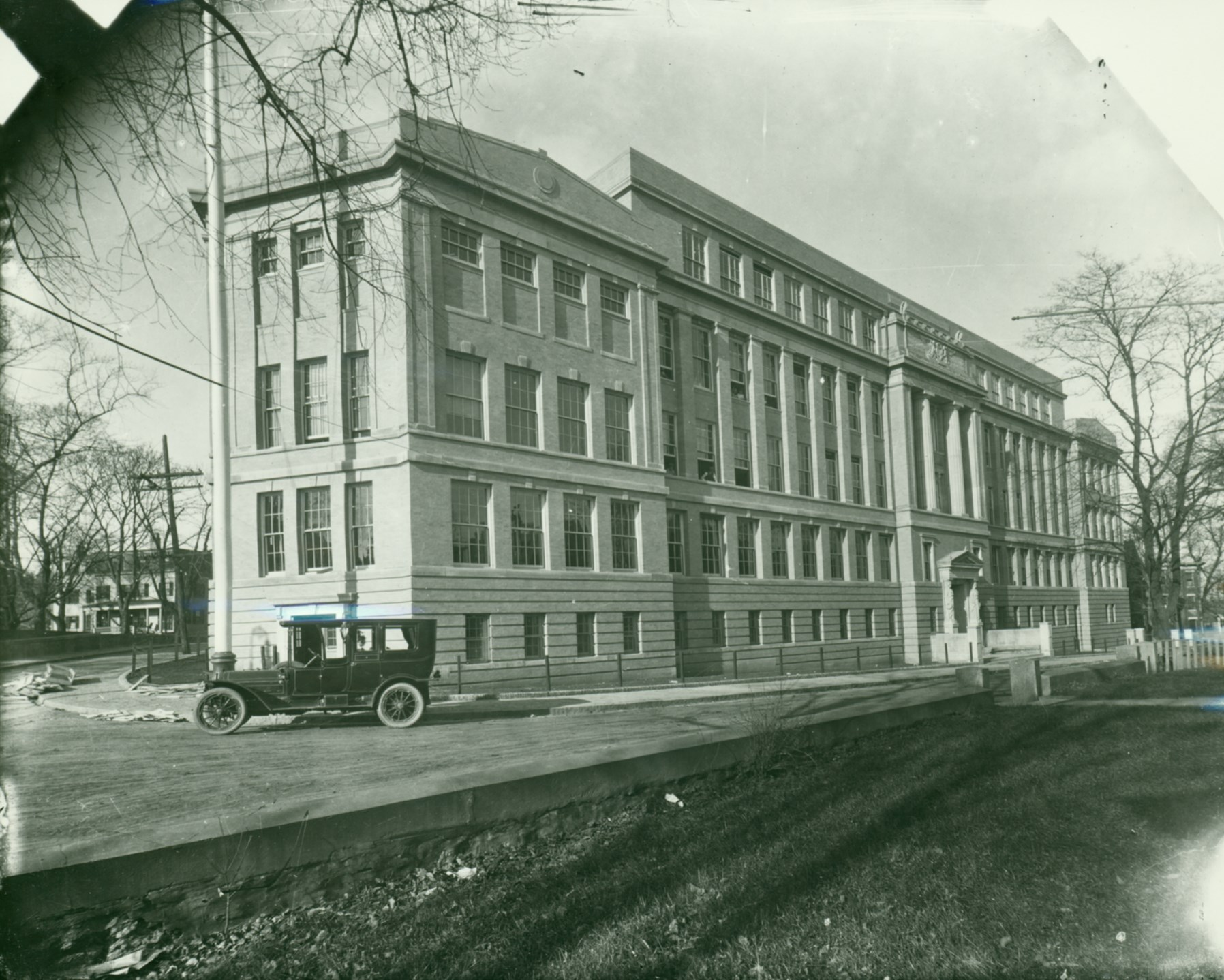
High School of Practical Arts, Roxbury, Massachusetts

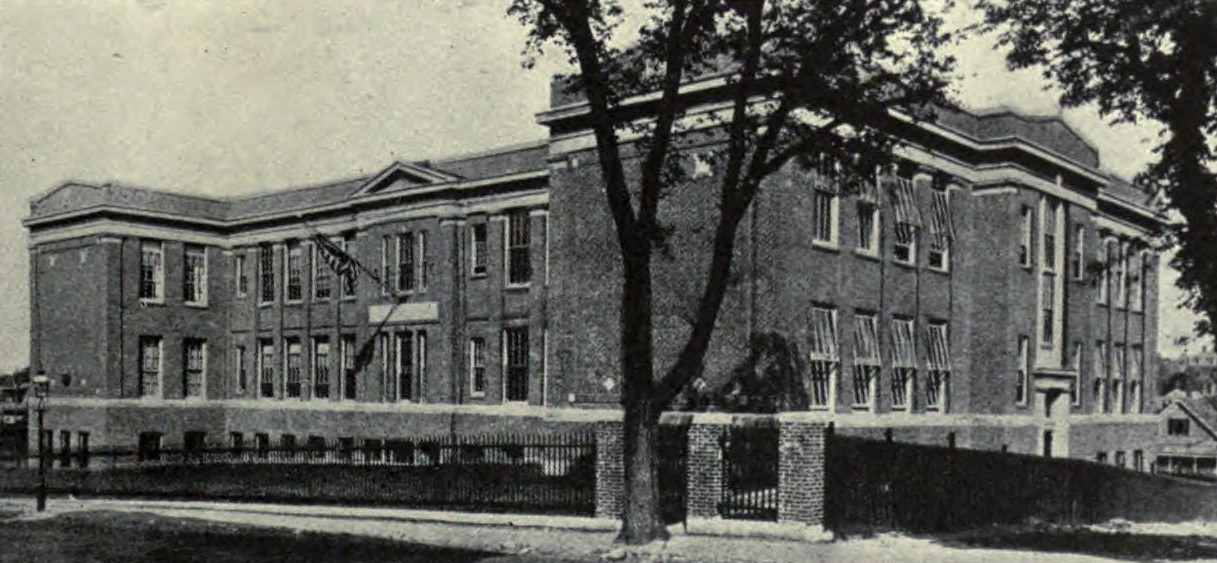
Quincy E. Dickerman School, Dorchester, Massachusetts

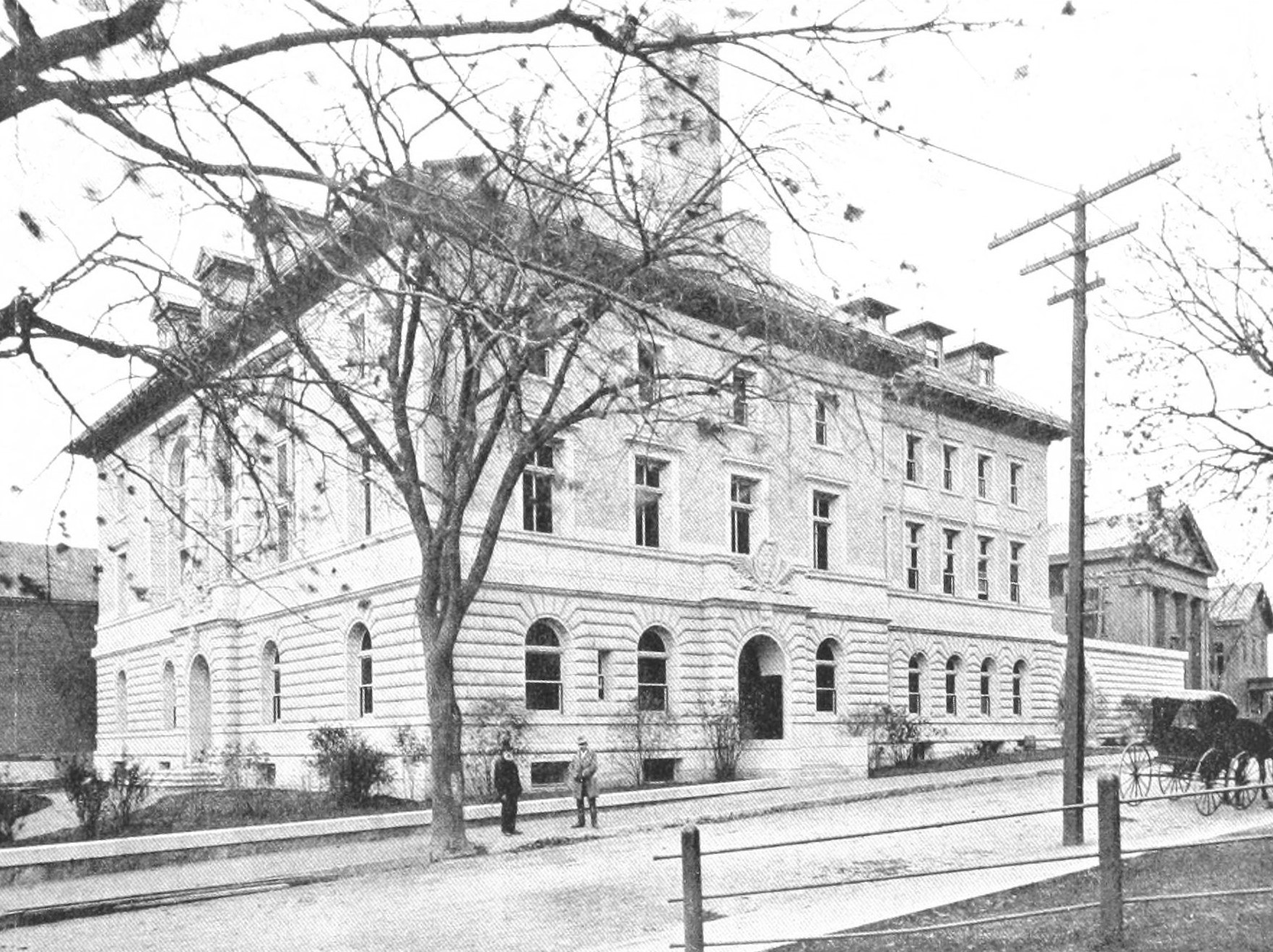
Police Station and Municipal Court Building, Brookline, Massachusetts

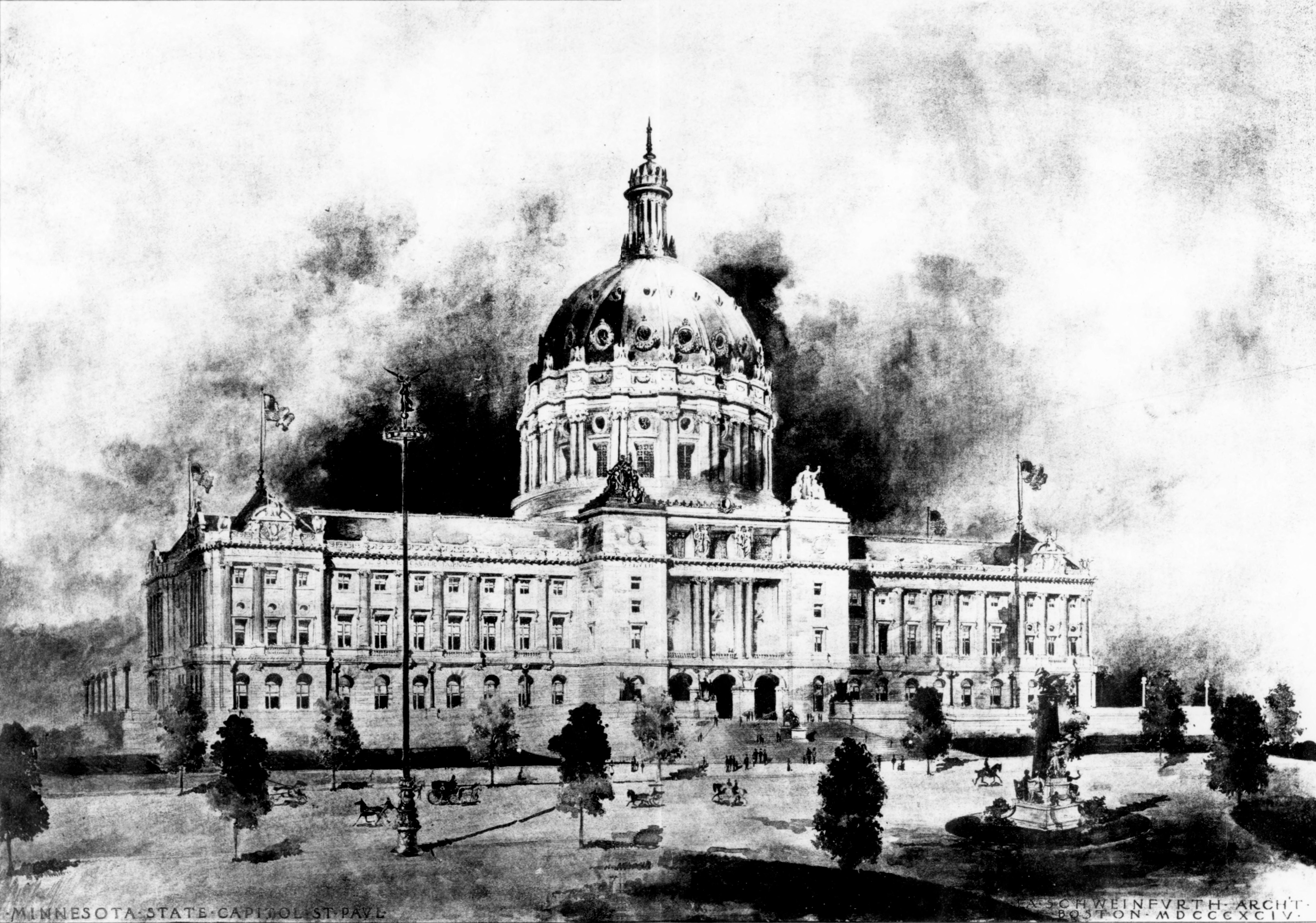
Competition design for the Minnesota State Capitol

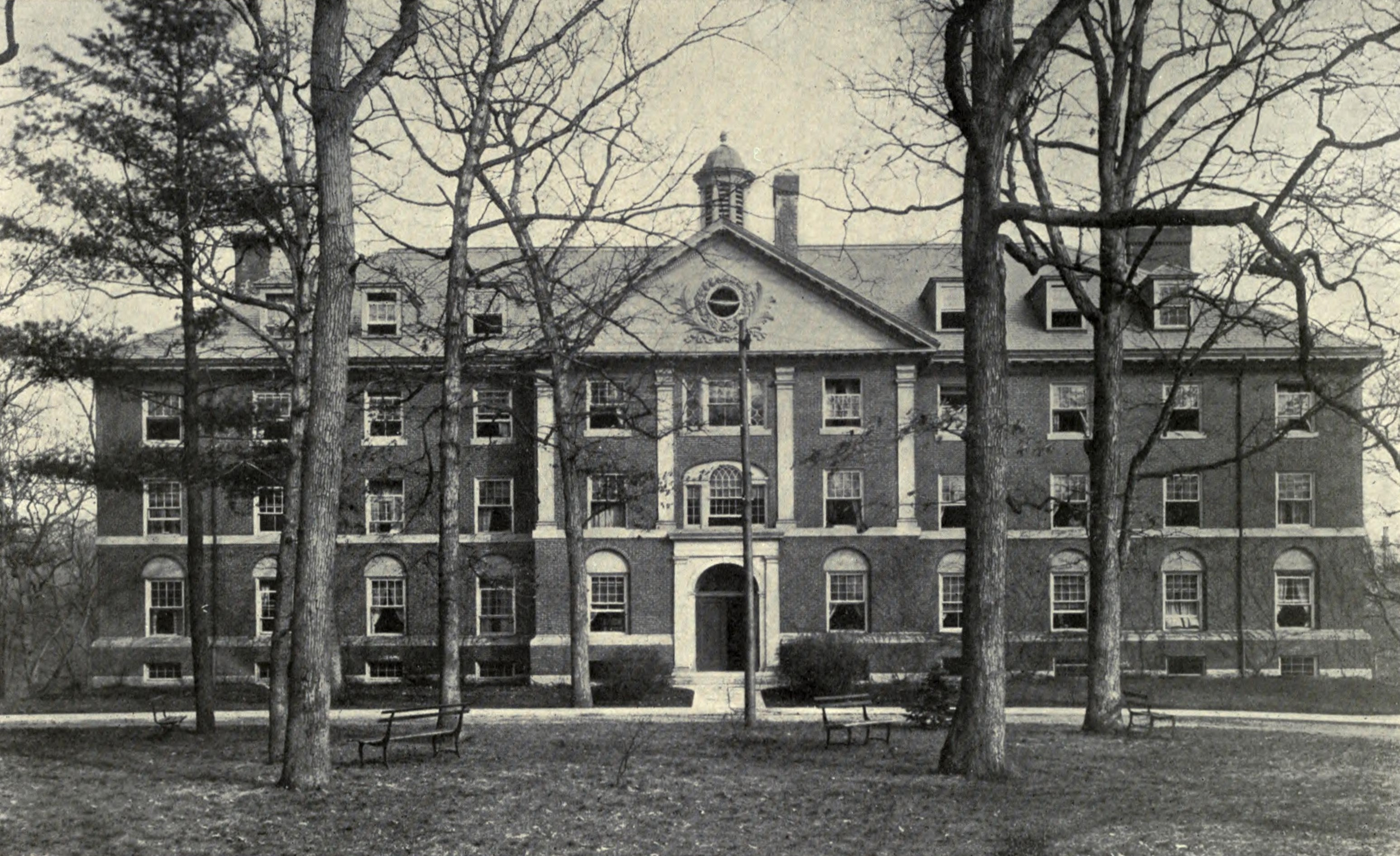
Wilder Hall, Wellesley College

=== Design works ===
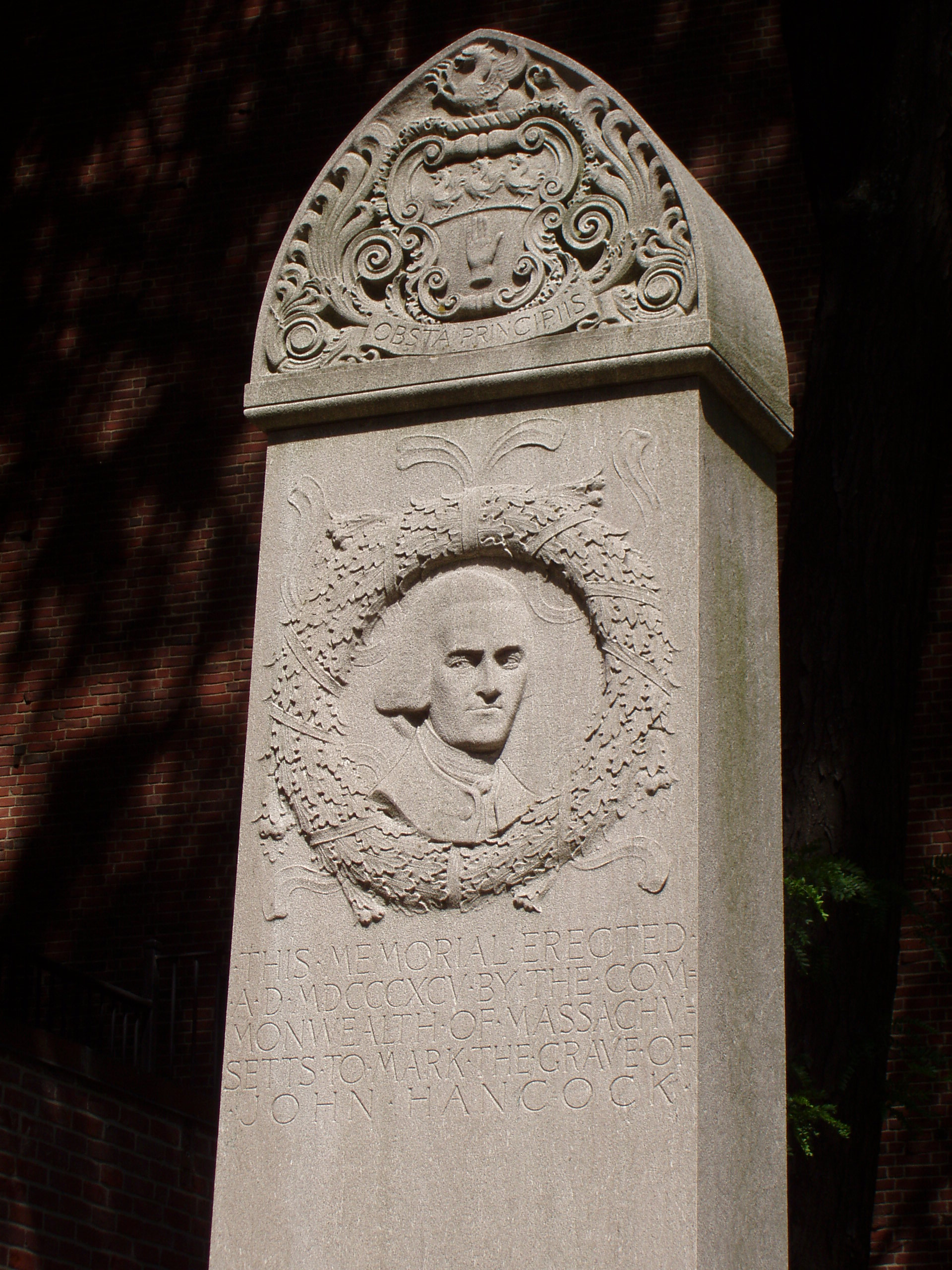
John Hancock memorial, Boston

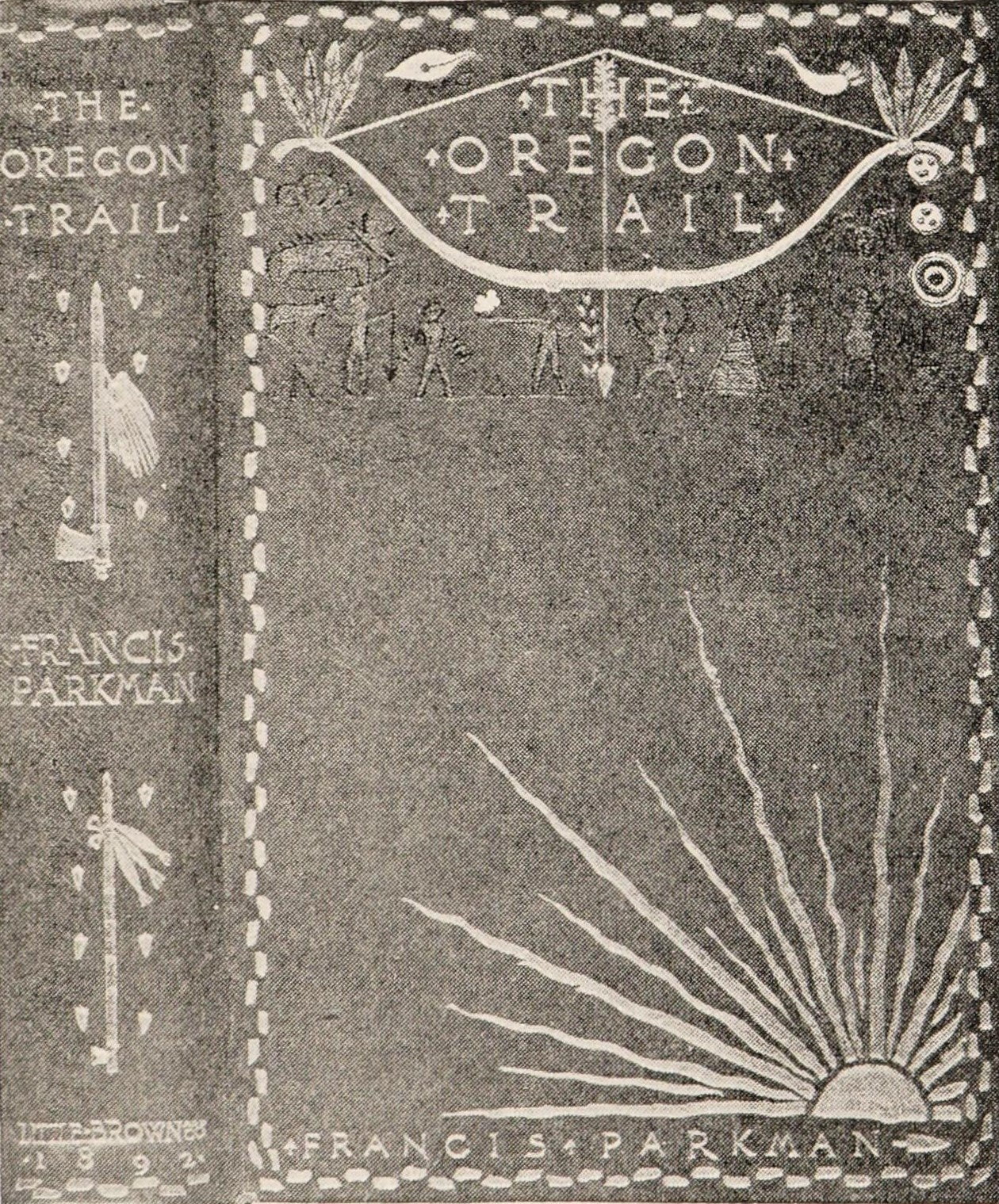
Cover for Francis Parkman's The Oregon Trail

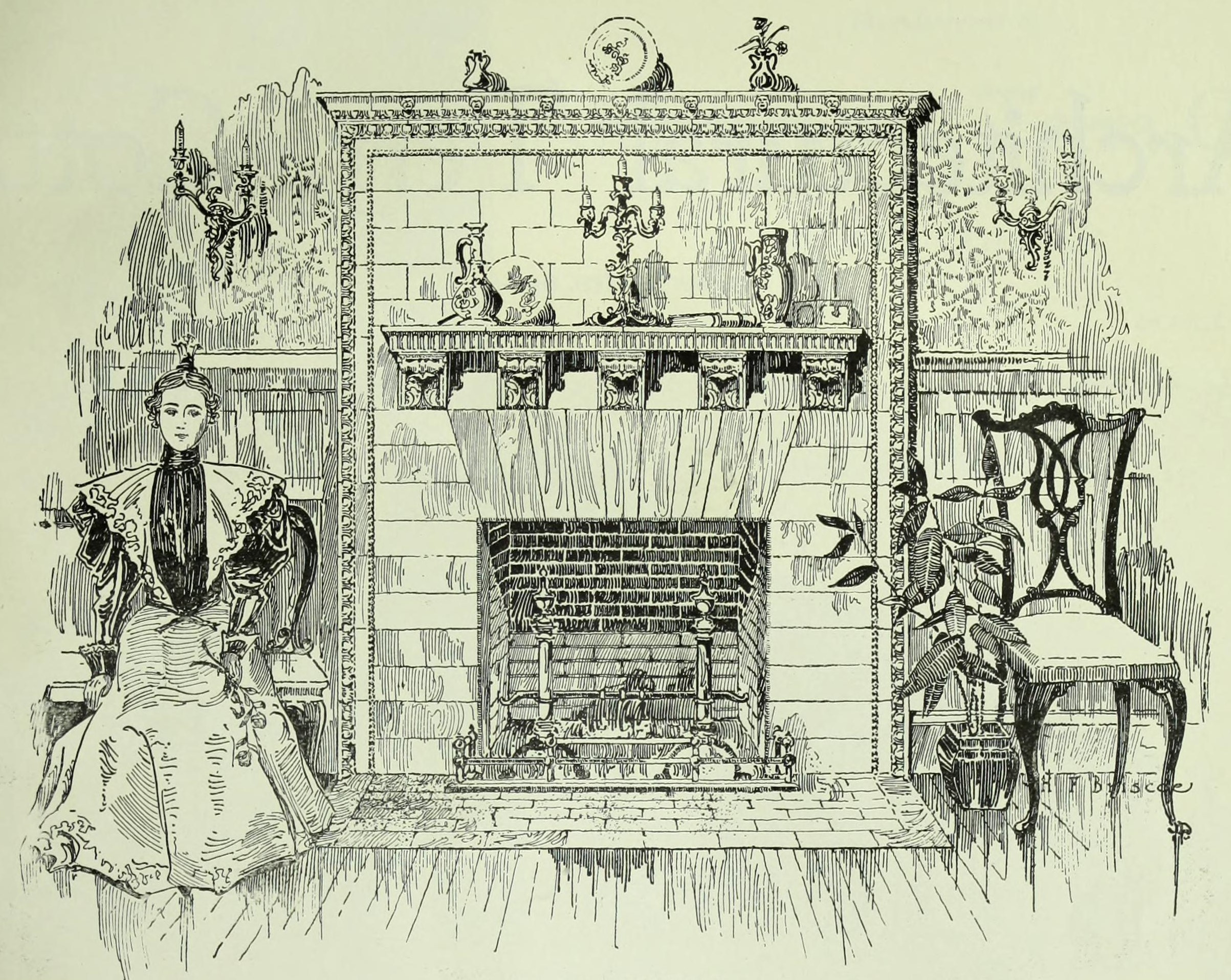
Fireplace design in The Brickbuilder

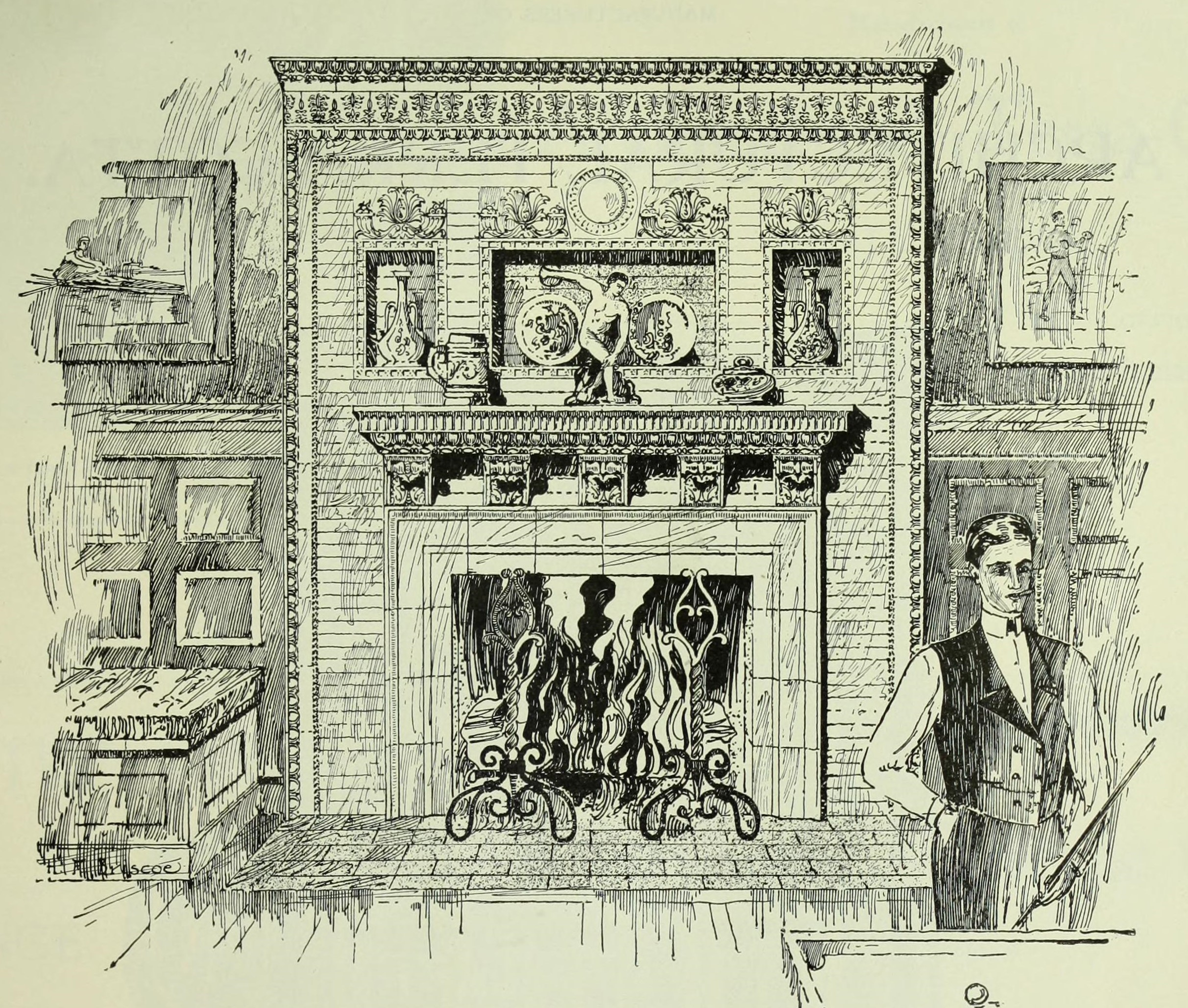
Fireplace design in The Brickbuilder

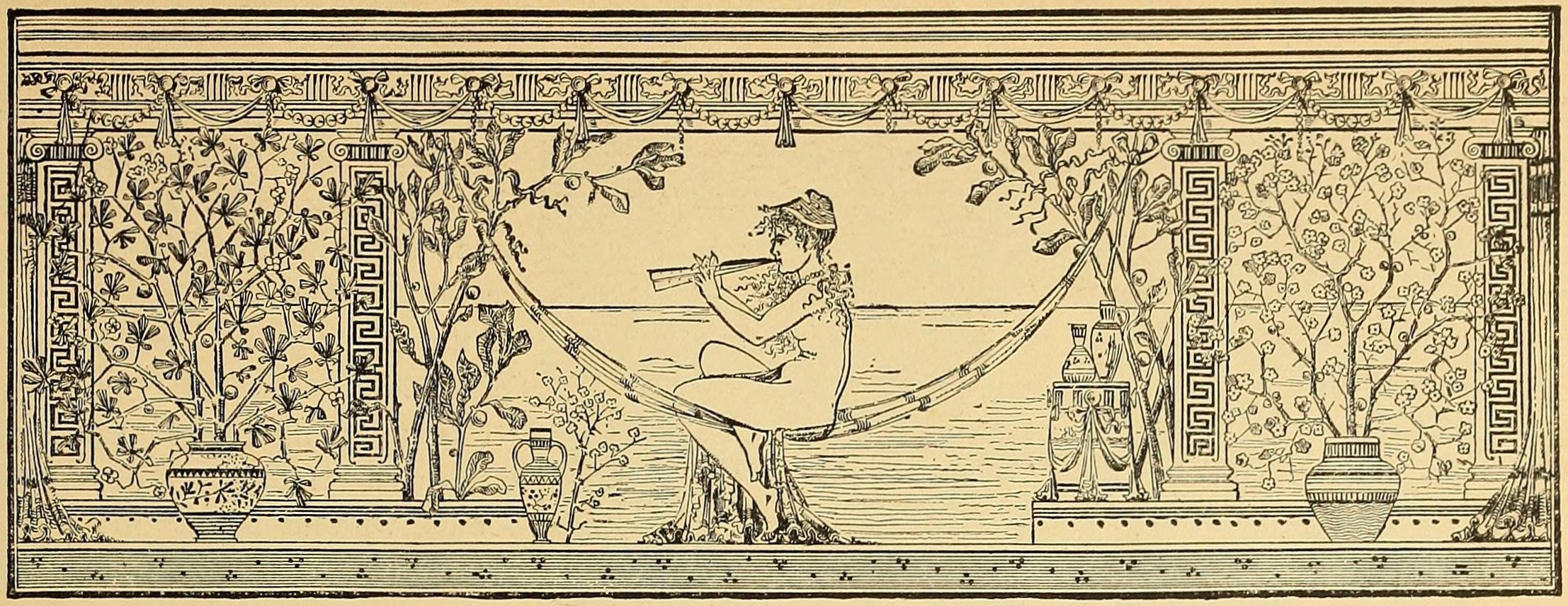
1889 illustration
