= Charles Schweinfurth =

American botanist and plant collector

Charles Schweinfurth (April 13, 1890 – November 16, 1970) was an American botanist and plant collector who distinguished himself by his studies on orchids. He predominantly collected species from Peru which he described in his four volume reference work Orchids of Peru (1958). He was a researcher at the Botanical Museum of Harvard University, and director of the Ames Orchid Herbarium where, in 1958, he was succeeded by Leslie Andrew Garay.

== Life ==
Schweinfurth was born in Brookline, Massachusetts in 1890, the son of Mary Frances and Julius Adolphe Schweinfurth, a noted architect. In 1909 Schweinfurth entered Harvard University where he majored in chemistry, although his course work included several biology courses such as taxonomic botany. Despite a bout with polio which left his right arm slightly paralyzed, he graduated cum laude in 1913, and entered Harvard graduate school.

In 1914 he took a job tending the living orchid collections of a Harvard professor, Oakes Ames. Ames recognized his intelligence and abilities and took him on as his personal assistant. Soon he had acquired the skills of a dedicated orchidologist. Ames had him doing independent work on the orchids of the Philippines, of Mount Kinabalu on Borneo and on some from various Pacific islands. Subsequently, he worked on the orchids of Central America, notably Honduras, Costa Rica and Panama. In 1922, James Francis Macbride invited him to join the "Flora of Peru Project", and Schweinfurth took on the Orchidaceae for his part. This eventually led to his magnum opus the Orchids of Peru

== Selected publications ==
- 1925. New or noteworthy species of Orchids from the American tropics with Ames, Oakes, Schedulae Orchidianae, No.8, pp. 1 – 91
- 1939. Notes on a remarkable collection of orchids from Panama. Botanical Museum Leaflets, Harvard University
- 1967. Orchidaceae of the Guayana Highland

=== Books ===
- Ames, Oakes; Hubbard, F. T. and Schweinfurth, Charles. (1936). The Genus Epidendrum in the United States & Middle America. Botanical Museum Cambridge, Massachusetts.
- 1958. Orchids of Peru. Chicago Natural Hist. Museum. Publication 837, 868, 885, 913. 4 vols. ISBN 0-608-02118-0

== Honors and homages ==
- 1958 Catedrático Honorario (honorary professor) from the National University of San Marcos in Peru
- 1962 an honorary professorship from the National University of San Antonio Abad in Cuzco, Peru
- 1966 elected an honorary member by the Sociedad Colombiana de Orquideologia

The following plants have been named after Schweinfurth in his honour:

Genera

- Cischweinfia Dressler & N.H.Williams, 1970

Species

- Rhynchopera schweinfurthii (Garay, 1954) Szlach. & Marg. 2001, originally Pleurothallis schweinfurthii
