= A. C. Schweinfurth =

American architect (1864–1900)

Albert Cicero Schweinfurth
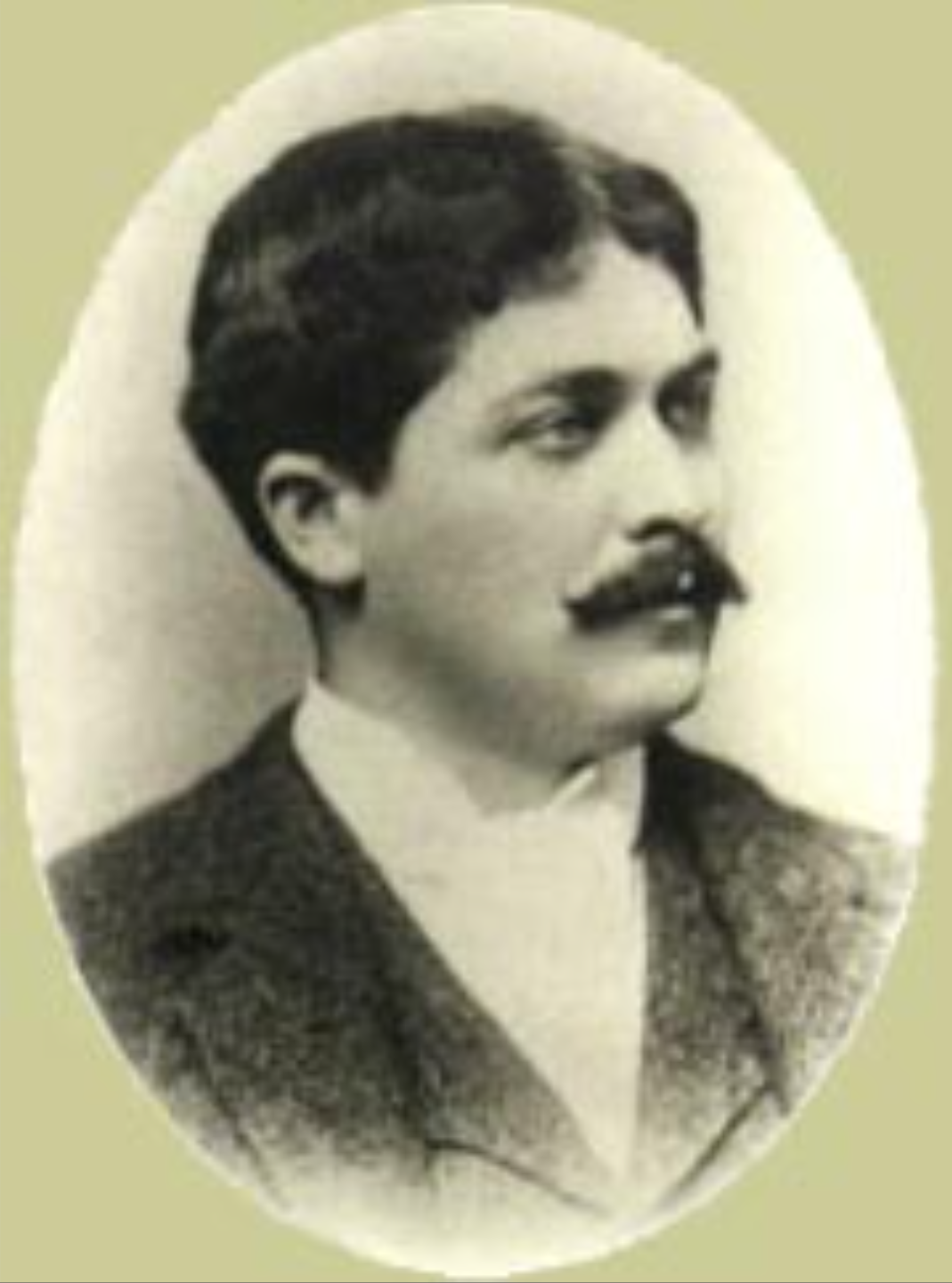
- Born: January 7, 1863; Auburn, New York
- Died: September 27, 1900 (aged 37); Dryden, New York
- Occupation: Architect
- Relatives: Charles F. Schweinfurth (brother); Julius A. Schweinfurth (brother)
- Buildings: First Unitarian Church, Moody house, Hacienda del Pozo de Verona

A. C. Schweinfurth (1864–1900), born Albert Cicero Schweinfurth, was an American architect. He is associated with the First Bay Tradition, an architectural style from the period of the 1880s to early 1920s.

== Early life ==
Schweinfurth was the son of a German woodcarver who had immigrated to the United States a decade before his son Albert was born. His brothers Charles, Julius, and Henry also practiced in the architectural profession.

== Career ==
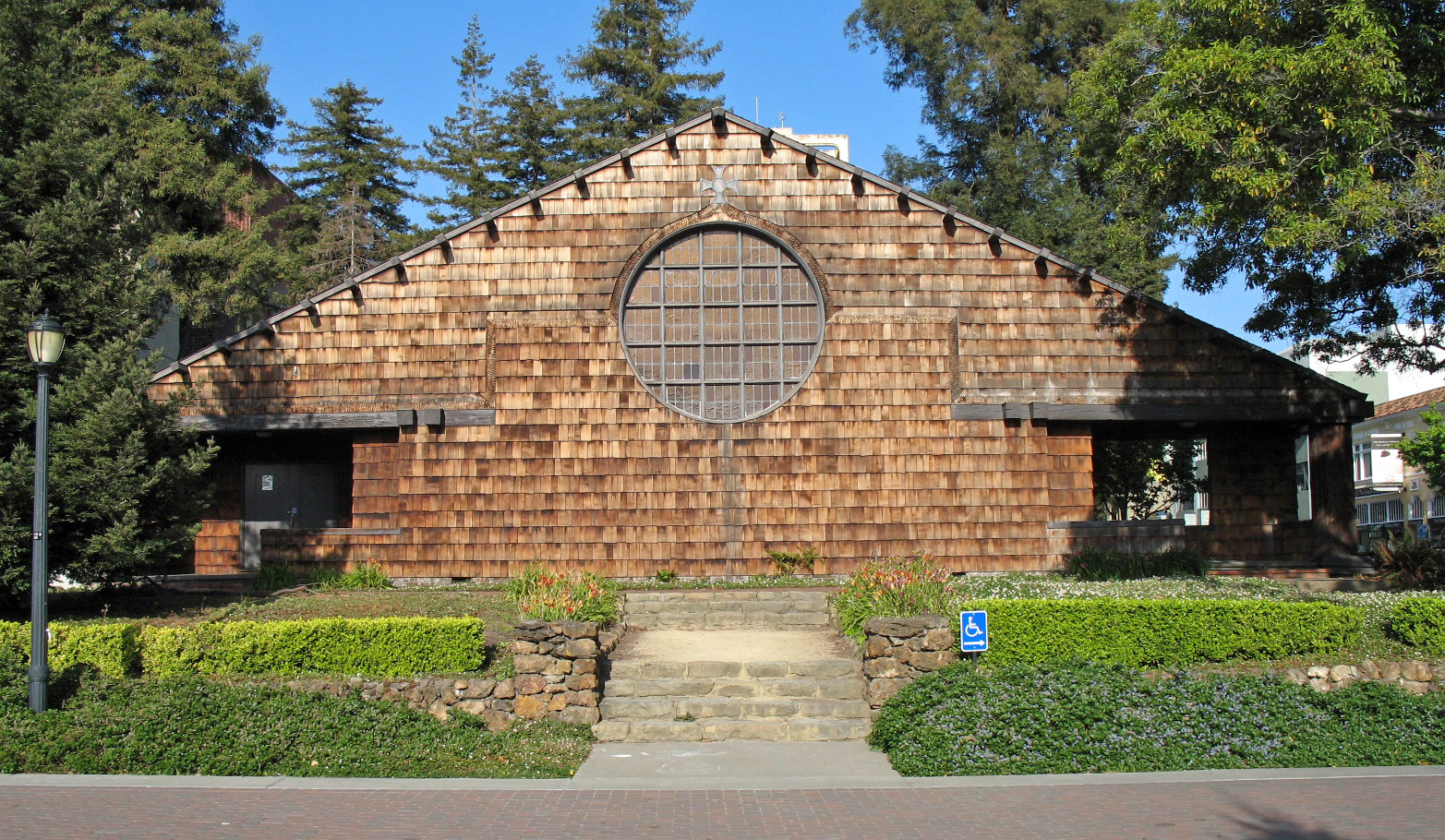
Schweinfurth's First Unitarian Church (1898) is listed in on the National Register of Historic Places.

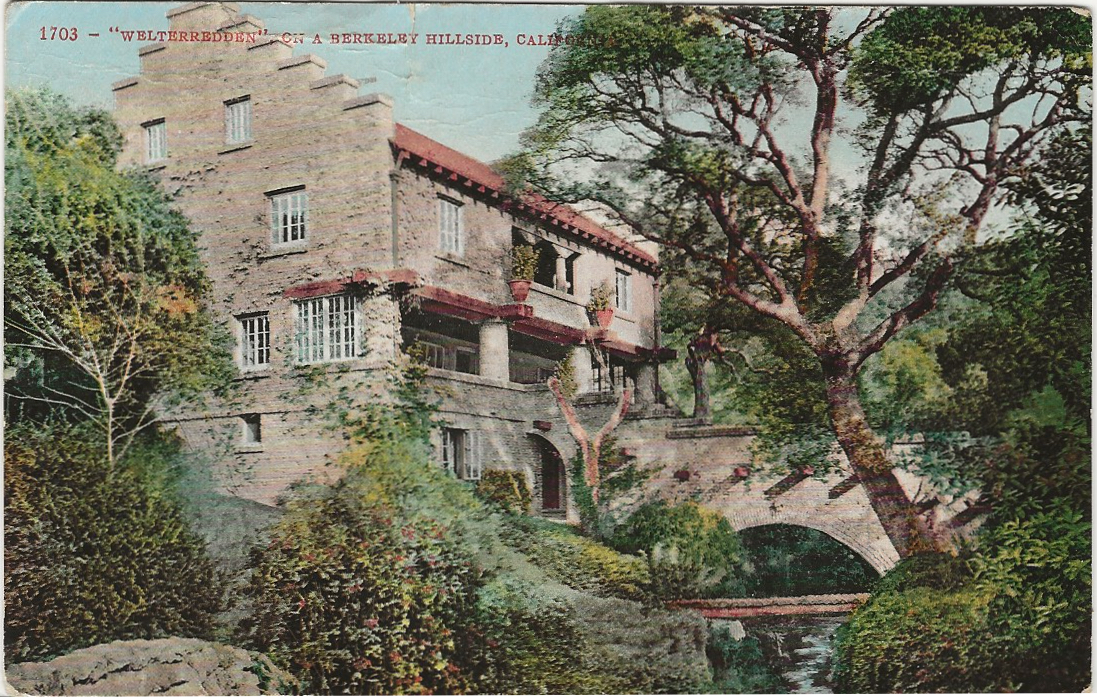
Dutch house Weltevreden located at 1755 Le Roy Avenue, Berkeley

Schweinfurth began his career in 1879. For the next decade he worked as a draftsman for various firms in Boston, Cleveland, New York, and Denver. In 1890, he moved to San Francisco and took a position as Chief Draftsman in the offices of A. Page Brown.

In 1894, Schweinfurth established his own architectural practice under the patronage of William Randolf Hearst. His Hacienda del Pozo de Verona (1894–1898), built for Phoebe Apperson Hearst in Pleasanton, was one of the first American buildings to incorporate features of Pueblo Revival architecture.

Schweinfurth also designed the First Unitarian Church, a "landmark in the history of Bay Area architecture" (1898), on the University of California, Berkeley campus.

Schweinfurth designed the Dutch house Weltevreden located at 1755 Le Roy Avenue, Berkeley, California, also known as Moody House and later as Tellefsen Hall.

== Death ==
In 1898, Schweinfurth embarked on a two-year tour of Italy and France with his wife, Fanny, and their seven-year-old daughter. Shortly after returning to the United States, he suffered an attack of typhoid fever. He died on September 27, 1900, in Dryden, N.Y.
