= Ridgewood Cemetery =

Historic cemetery in Massachusetts, United States

- U.S. National Register of Historic Places
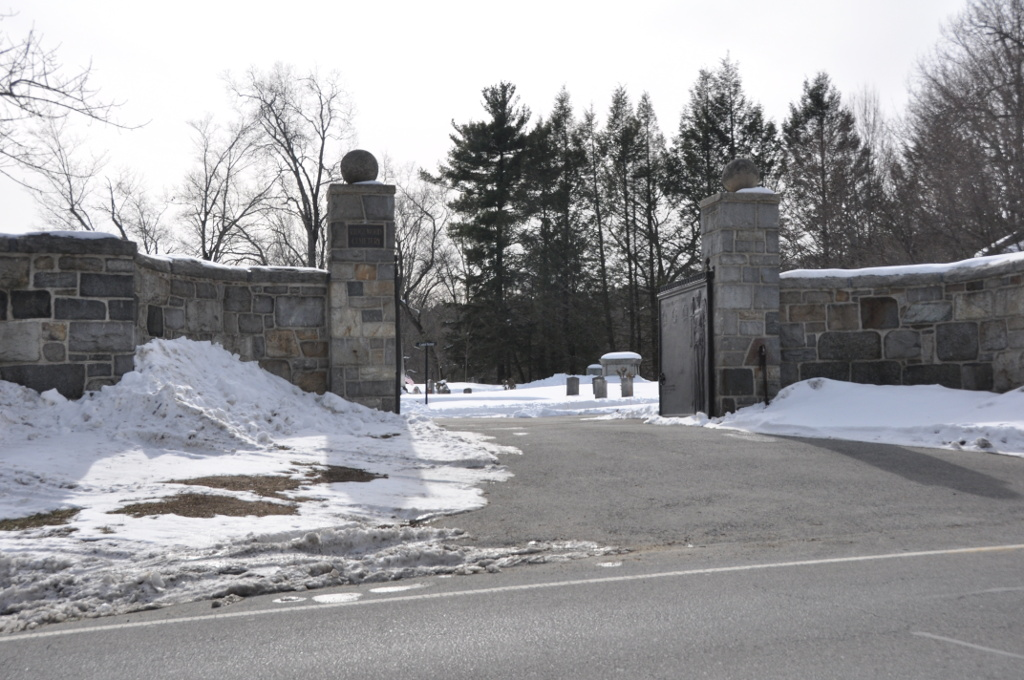
- Cemetery entrance

- Location within Massachusetts Location within the United States
- Location: 177 Salem St., North Andover, Massachusetts
- Coordinates: 42°40′49″N 71°6′9″W
- Area: 46 acres (19 ha)
- Built: 1850
- NRHP reference No.: 15001049
- Added to NRHP: February 8, 2016

Ridgewood Cemetery is a historic cemetery at 177 Salem Street in North Andover, Massachusetts. Organized in 1849 and opened in 1850, it is the town's third cemetery, and the first in the then-fashionable rural cemetery style. It was listed on the National Register of Historic Places in 2016. It is owned and operated by a non-profit cemetery association, and remains in active use, with about 3,000 marked burials.

== Layout and history ==
Ridgewood Cemetery is located in central North Andover, on the south side of Salem Street between Johnson Street and Marbleridge Road. It is a rough oblong property, extending south nearly to Abbott Street. Facing Salem Street, the property is edged by a fieldstone wall, with an impressive early 20th-century bronze gate as its primary entrance. Secondary entrances are located further southeast on Salem Street and on Marbleridge Road. The oldest portion of the cemetery is on the rise between the two Salem Street entrances. From this height the property slopes down to a stream that roughly divides the property, with a rise on the far side that levels off. The most modern sections of the cemetery are on the far side of the stream.

The cemetery organization was established in 1849, and the first burial took place on November 9, 1850. It was originally called Andover Cemetery, but was renamed Ridgewood Cemetery after North Andover was separated from Andover in 1865.

The first sections of the cemetery followed the rural cemetery concepts, with winding lanes and sculptural burial sites. In the 1930s an expansion was designed by landscape architect Harland P. Kelsey in consultation with Frederick Law Olmsted Jr. The gates, a gift of mill owner George Gilbert, were designed by Julius A. Schweinfurth and installed in 1909.

== See also ==
- National Register of Historic Places listings in Essex County, Massachusetts
