= Mather =

Mather may refer to:

== People ==
- Mather (given name), a list of people with the given name
- Mather (surname), a list of people with the surname

== Places ==
- Mather, California (disambiguation)
- Mather, Manitoba, Canada, a community
- Mather, Pennsylvania, an unincorporated community
- Mather, Wisconsin, an unincorporated community
- 49700 Mather, an asteroid
- Mather Air Force Base, east of Sacramento, California
- Mathers Bridge, Merritt Island, Florida
- Mather Gorge, on the border between Maryland and Virginia
- Mount Mather (disambiguation)

== Other uses ==
- Mather House (disambiguation)
- Mather Stock Car Company, an American corporation that built railroad rolling stock
- Mather Inn, a hotel in Ishpeming, Michigan
- Mather Tower, Chicago, Illinois
- The Mather School, oldest public elementary school in North America

== See also ==
- Mathers
