= Mather House =

Mather House may refer to:

- Mather House (Case Western Reserve University), classroom building
- Mather House (Convent, Louisiana), 1811 home
- Mather House (Harvard University), residence
- Call House, also known as the Henry R. and Mary Hewitt Mather House, Marquette, Michigan
- Mather House Museum, Port Jefferson, New York
- Mather-Kirkland House, Austin, Texas, listed on the NRHP in Travis County, Texas
- Stephen Tyng Mather Home, also known as Mather House or Mather Homestead, Darien, Connecticut

== See also ==
- Mather Estate House, Perrysburg, Ohio, designed by Mills, Rhines, Bellman & Nordhoff
- Mather Homestead (Hartford, Connecticut), listed on the NRHP in Hartford, Connecticut
- Mather Inn, Ishpeming, Michigan
- William Mathers House, Carlisle, Kentucky, listed on the NRHP in Nicholas County, Kentucky
