= Samuel Otis =

Samuel Otis may refer to:

- Samuel Allyne Otis (1740–1814), first Secretary of the United States Senate
- Samuel Shackford Otis (1891–1974), architect from Winnetka, Illinois
