= Flora Stone Mather College Historic District =

Historic district in Ohio, United States

- Flora Stone Mather College District
- U.S. National Register of Historic Places
- U.S. Historic district
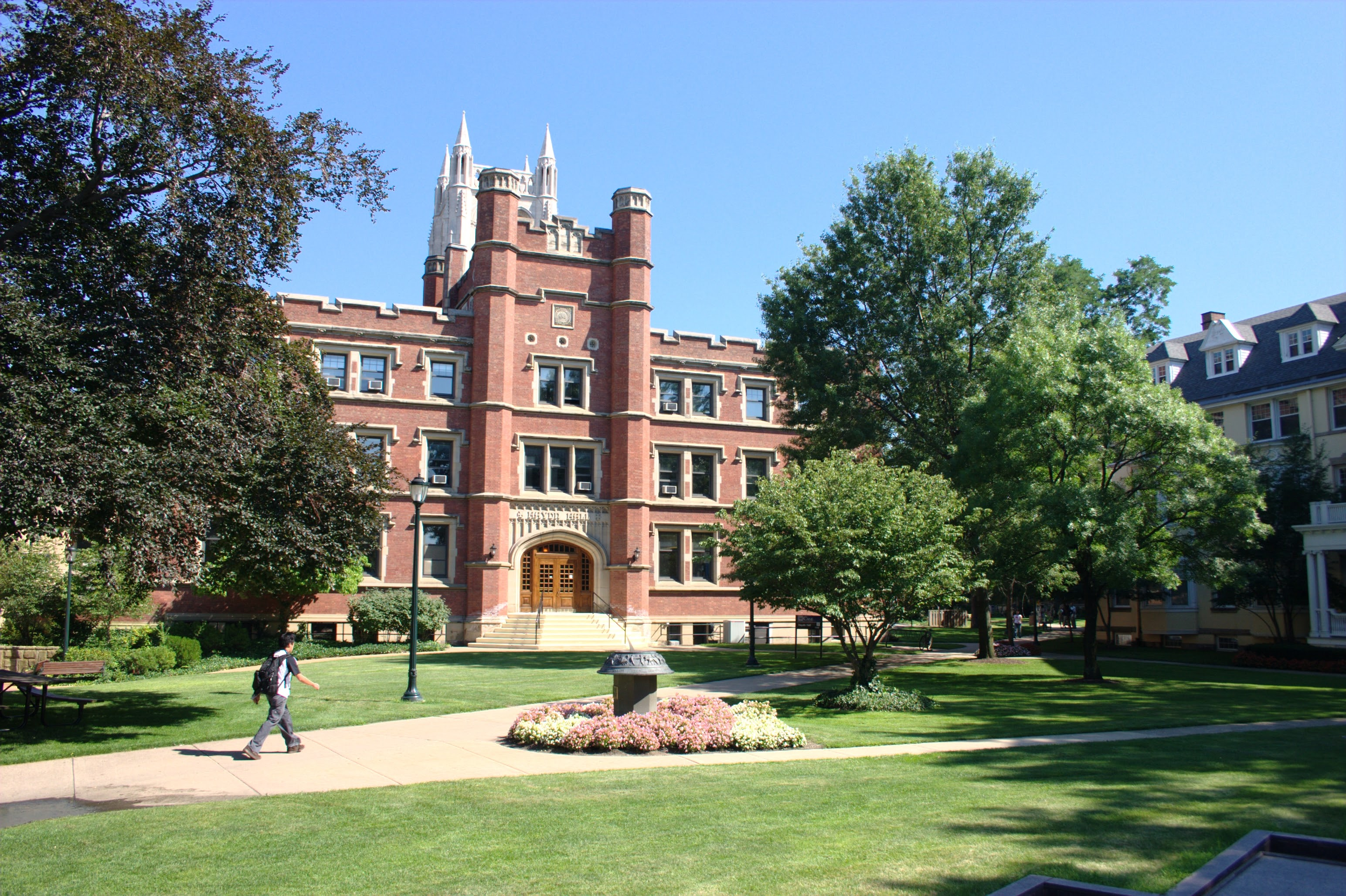
- Haydn Hall

- Location within Cleveland Location within Ohio Location within the United States
- Location: Bellflower Rd. at Ford Dr., Cleveland, Ohio
- Coordinates: 41°30′32″N 81°36′28″W
- Area: 3.6 acres (1.5 ha)
- Architect: Multiple
- Architectural style: Late 19th and 20th Century Revivals
- NRHP reference No.: 74001442
- Added to NRHP: February 15, 1974

The Flora Stone Mather College District is a 3.6-acre (1.5 ha) historic district in Cleveland, Ohio, United States. It includes five contributing buildings.

The district is in the University Circle neighborhood, on the campus of Case Western Reserve University. It bears the name of philanthropist Flora Stone Mather, whose personal and family support funded buildings throughout the campus. The included buildings are Clark Hall, Guilford House, Haydn Hall, Harkness Chapel, and the Mather Memorial Building. Mather House and Mather Dance Center are within the district, but are not considered contributing buildings.

Clark Hall and Guilford House (also known as Guilford Cottage) were built in 1891–1892. Clark Hall is the only known work in Cleveland by architect Richard Morris Hunt. Guilford House was designed by Cleveland architects Coburn & Barnum and named after Linda Thayer Guilford.

Florence Harkness Memorial Chapel and Haydn Hall were both built during 1901–02. Flora Stone Mather Memorial Hall was built during 1910–1912. All three were designed by architect Charles F. Schweinfurth. A 1930 addition to the Mather Memorial Building was designed by Charles Hopkinson.

== See also ==
- Her Fathers' Daughter: Flora Stone Mather and Her Gifts to Cleveland, Retrieved February 21, 2016
