= Mather Mansion =

- U.S. National Register of Historic Places
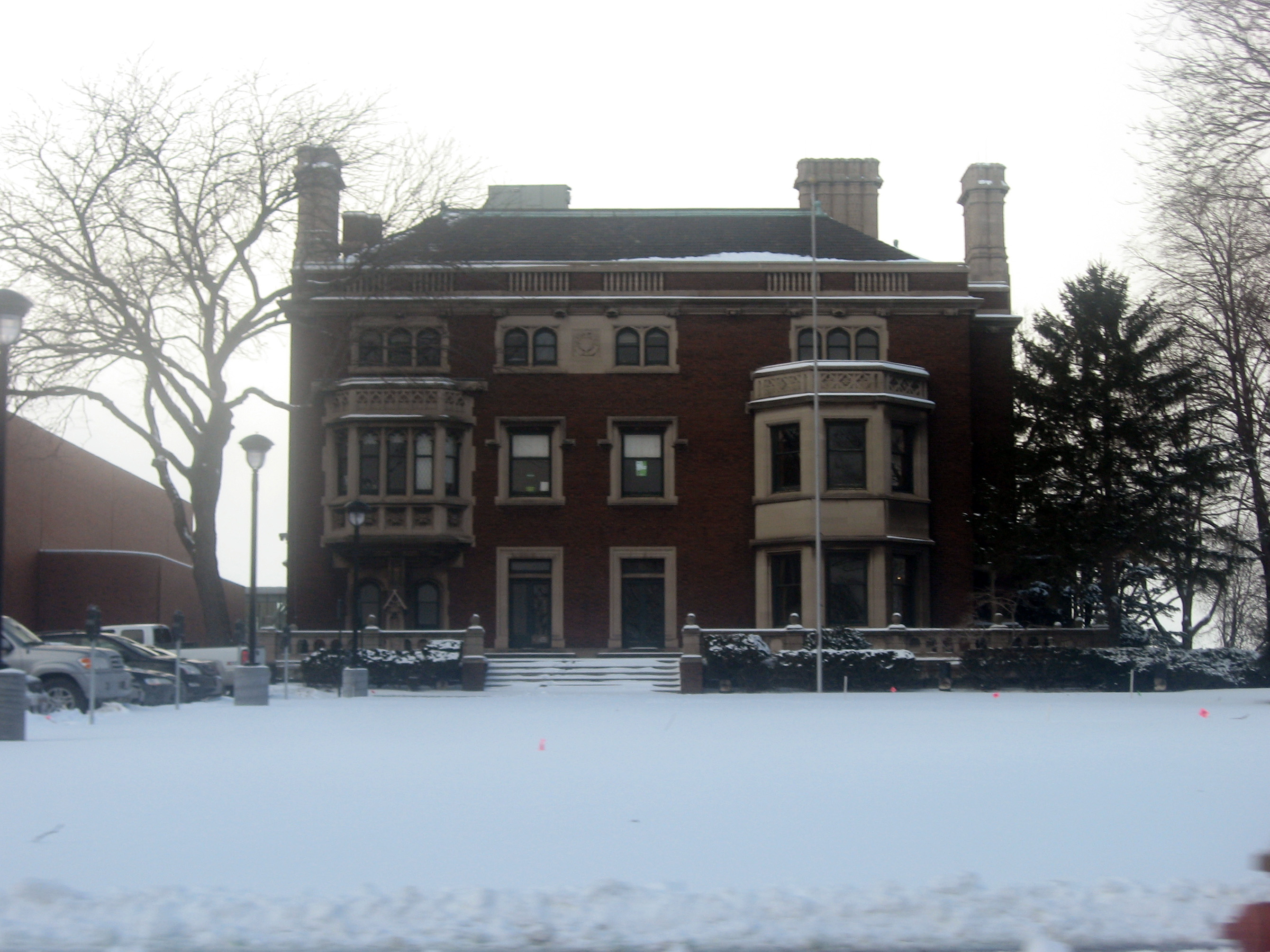
- Mather Mansion aka University Hall
- Location: 2605 Euclid Avenue Campus District Cleveland, Ohio 44115
- Coordinates: 41°30′11.14″N 81°40′14.18″W
- Area: Cleveland State
- Built: 1906-1910
- Architect: Charles F. Schweinfurth
- Architectural style: Old Tudor Revival
- NRHP reference No.: 02000702
- Added to NRHP: February 23, 1973

The Mather Mansion as it is officially known was completed in 1910 by the famous New York-trained preeminent Cleveland architect Charles F. Schweinfurth who built the 45-room Tudor Revival style (which hearkens back to English country gentry) home for the illustrious Cleveland shipping and ore mining magnate Samuel Livingston Mather II. The home sits on the prominent Cleveland thoroughfare of Euclid Avenue near the I-90 Bridge located by East 30th Street.

The home has been owned by Cleveland State University since 1967. It was renovated by the school in 2006–2007. It is one of the last surviving mansions on Euclid. One by one these grand houses of the well-to-do were demolished to make way for new construction, but the Mather remained. The ceilings are 16 feet high inside the massive dwelling's ballroom. The property included sunken gardens.

It is part of the much larger Euclid Avenue Historic District which encompasses over twenty properties, that was one of the first bulk entries of numerous historical properties in the city in the 1970s. In 2014, the house served as the university's English as a second language department. The mansion is said to be haunted.

== History ==
In the late 1870s to the early 1910s, Cleveland's Euclid Avenue began to be dotted with several mansions that sprang up as Cleveland started to attract wealthy industrialist with its major businesses of coal, steel, iron, shipping, and oil. John D. Rockefeller, the undisputed king of Standard Oil and richest man in history it is alleged, Amasa Stone the Cleveland railroad baron father of Mather's wife, Charles F. Brush the inventor, George Worthington, Marcus A. Hanna, John Hay, Jeptha Wade, Charles E. J. Lang, and Mather all had homes built here by 1911. Euclid Avenue was once known as the "Most beautiful street in the world". The concentration of wealth within this narrow strip of land has never been replicated again.

Schweinfurth was on something of a building spurt and designed more than fifteen homes for the Cleveland aristocracy, most of these homes are gone. A few still survive including Mather's, Case's near Case Western Reserve University in the University neighborhood, the Stager Beckwith near the Cleveland Clinic Main Campus, and the Parker-Hannifin House on the Cleveland State Campus which serves as the School of Graduate Studies at CSU.

The 15, 121 sq. ft. house was turned over to Cleveland State in 1967 after having passed through multiple hands following Mather's death in 1931 including the Cleveland Institute of Music and the Cleveland Automobile Club. For decades the historic relic was furnished to serve as offices and official functions of the university until it was all but abandoned in the early 2010s. It was reopened to the general public in late 2015 after a $2.7 million rehab.

== Mather family ==
The house was the last grand house built on Euclid and was to be the family home of the large Mather clan which included four children, Samuel Livingston Mather III (b. 1882) named after his father, Amasa Stone (b. 1884) named for his grandfather on his mother's side, Constance (b. 1889) and Philip Richard (b. 1894). It is noteworthy to realize that his wife, Flora Stone Mather, never saw the completed manor as she died of breast cancer before the family could move in and so her daughter Constance became the lady of the house, as was the custom at the time, she even invited the Cleveland Orchestra to perform at parties several times while living there. This happenstance may be a factor in why many say the house is haunted until this day. The Mathers also owned a summer residence named Shoreby in the Cleveland municipality Bratenahl, which still has the 6th highest per capita income at over $80,000 in the state of Ohio. That reality has not changed much as the area was the playground for the very wealthy in the Mathers hey day as well.

== Location ==
The survival of this homestead provides Cleveland architectural historians with a glimpse into early 20th century residential dwelling construction. The house, as was the fashion of many historic homes at the time, sits at a remove of more than ten yards from the street grid and resembles a southern plantation, English Manor House, or Great House more than a typical city house.

The orientation of the house aligns visual sightlines with its curved structure. The building features minimal exterior decoration, similar in style to a library or hotel. Access to the house is through a university-controlled parcel of land, which previously contained an inclined driveway from lower Euclid. Surrounding modern developments have altered the original landscape setting of the building.

== Hauntings ==
The mansion was most likely not a terribly happy place for Mather and his young family as his wife's death left a hole, and this may be why some have said the house seems spiritually unsettled. A group of paranormal investigators based in central Ohio started in 1984 called the Ohio Ghost Hunters (OGH) examined the home in 2016, following the renovation of the historic property presumably because someone "saw something". The current director of the OGH group, Peggy, led several people on guided tours of the 45-room manor to hunt for spirits and casually asked if any ghosts of the Mather family were present in various rooms, later claiming that she heard a child laughing which is interesting considering that youngest Mather (Philip) would have been over 15 by the time the family settled into the brand new abode.

== See also ==
- National Register of Historic Places listings in Cleveland

== Scholarly works ==
- Girouard, Mark (1978). Life in the English Country House: A Social and Architectural History. New Haven: Yale University Press. ISBN 0-300-02273-5. Details the impact of social change on design..
