= Sylvester T. Everett =

American financier

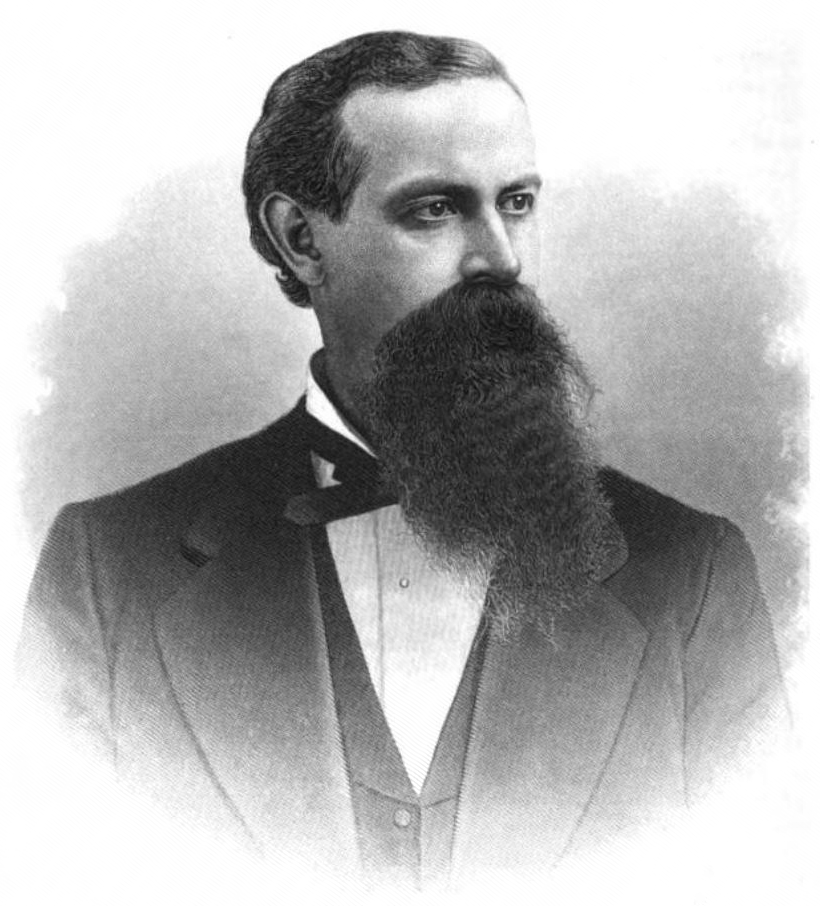
- Born: Sylvester Thomas Everett; November 27, 1838; Liberty Township, Ohio, US
- Died: January 13, 1922 (aged 83); Cleveland, Ohio, US
- Occupation: Financier
- Spouses: Mary M. Everett (m. 1860; died 1876) Alice Louisa Wade (m. 1879; died 1916)

Signature
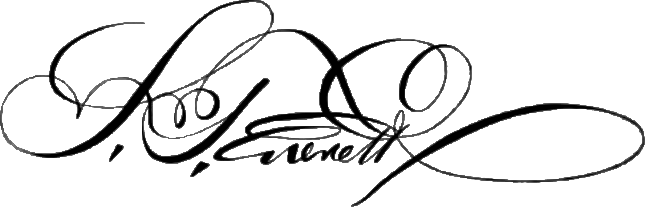

Sylvester Thomas Everett (November 27, 1838 – January 13, 1922) was an American financier.

== Life and career ==
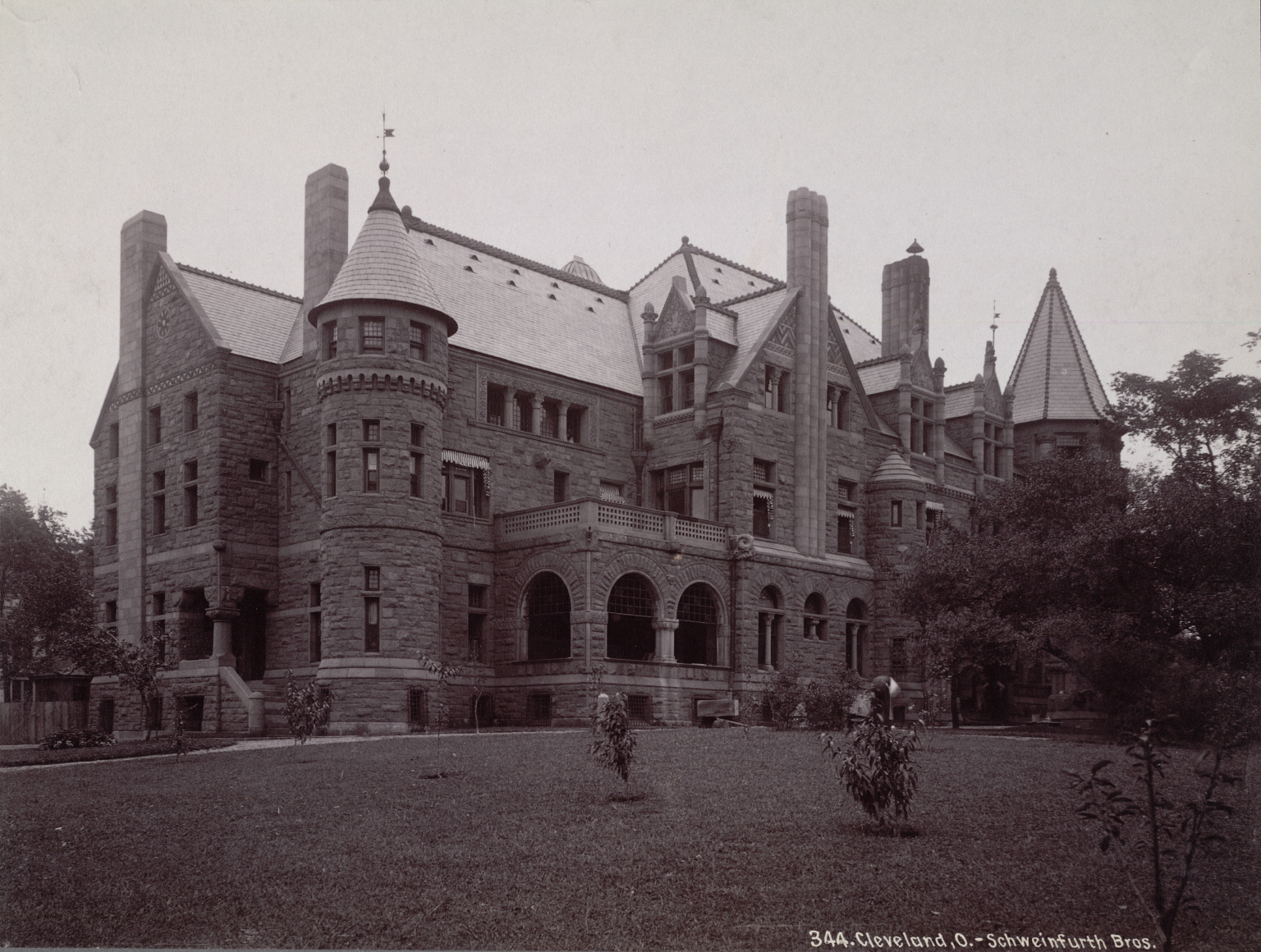
Sylvester Everett's mansion, back view, on Euclid Avenue (since demolished), designed by Charles F. Schweinfurth

Born in Liberty Township, Ohio on November 27, 1838, he worked on his father's farm until 1850. Everett moved to Cleveland in 1851 to work, first as a messenger and later as a cashier, at Cleveland's oldest banking house, Brockway, Wason, Everett & Co (co-founded by his brother, Dr. Henry Everett).

Everett left Cleveland in 1858 to work at a bank in Philadelphia while helping settle the affairs of his uncle, Charles Everett. He returned to Cleveland a year later to his banking house position. In 1868, he became a member of Everett, Weddell & Co. (previously Brockway, Wason, Everett & Co.).

Everett served seven terms, from 1869 to 1888, as Treasurer of the city of Cleveland. He was a prominent member of the Republican Party, being friends with President of the United States James Garfield who appointed Everett as U.S. government director of the Union Pacific Railroad. Everett played a part in Marcus Hanna being elected an Ohio delegate to the 1884 Republican National Convention and himself served as an Ohio delegate at the 1872, 1880, 1888 and 1896 Republican National Conventions.

Everett's involvement with transportation led him to help finance and build some of the first U.S. electric streetcar systems in Akron, Ohio and Erie, Pennsylvania. He served as vice-president and treasurer of the Valley Railway, completed in 1880, which ran between Cleveland and Akron. A train depot and surrounding community Everett, Ohio on the railway were named Everett.

In 1876, he became president of Second National Bank, later reorganized as the Union National Bank.

Everett married Mary M. Everett in January 1860. She died in October 1876. On October 22, 1879, he remarried to Alice Louisa Wade, granddaughter of Jeptha Wade. They commissioned Charles F. Schweinfurth to come to Cleveland from New York City to build the Romanesque style Sylvester Everett Mansion, started in 1883 and completed in 1887.

In 1883, he was asked to resign as president of Union National Bank by Henry B. Payne, at the request of the bank's directors. Everett had speculated in stocks, including the Northern Pacific Railway, with his own money, which was contrary to bank rules. He retained a financial interest in Everett, Weddell & Co. until 1883. It failed in 1884, amid later allegations by Horace Weddell that Everett and his brother had misrepresented the bank's solvency.

Everett's wife Alice died on February 12, 1916. He died from pneumonia at his home in Cleveland on January 13, 1922.
