= Millet House =

Historic Creole cottage in Louisiana

- U.S. National Register of Historic Places
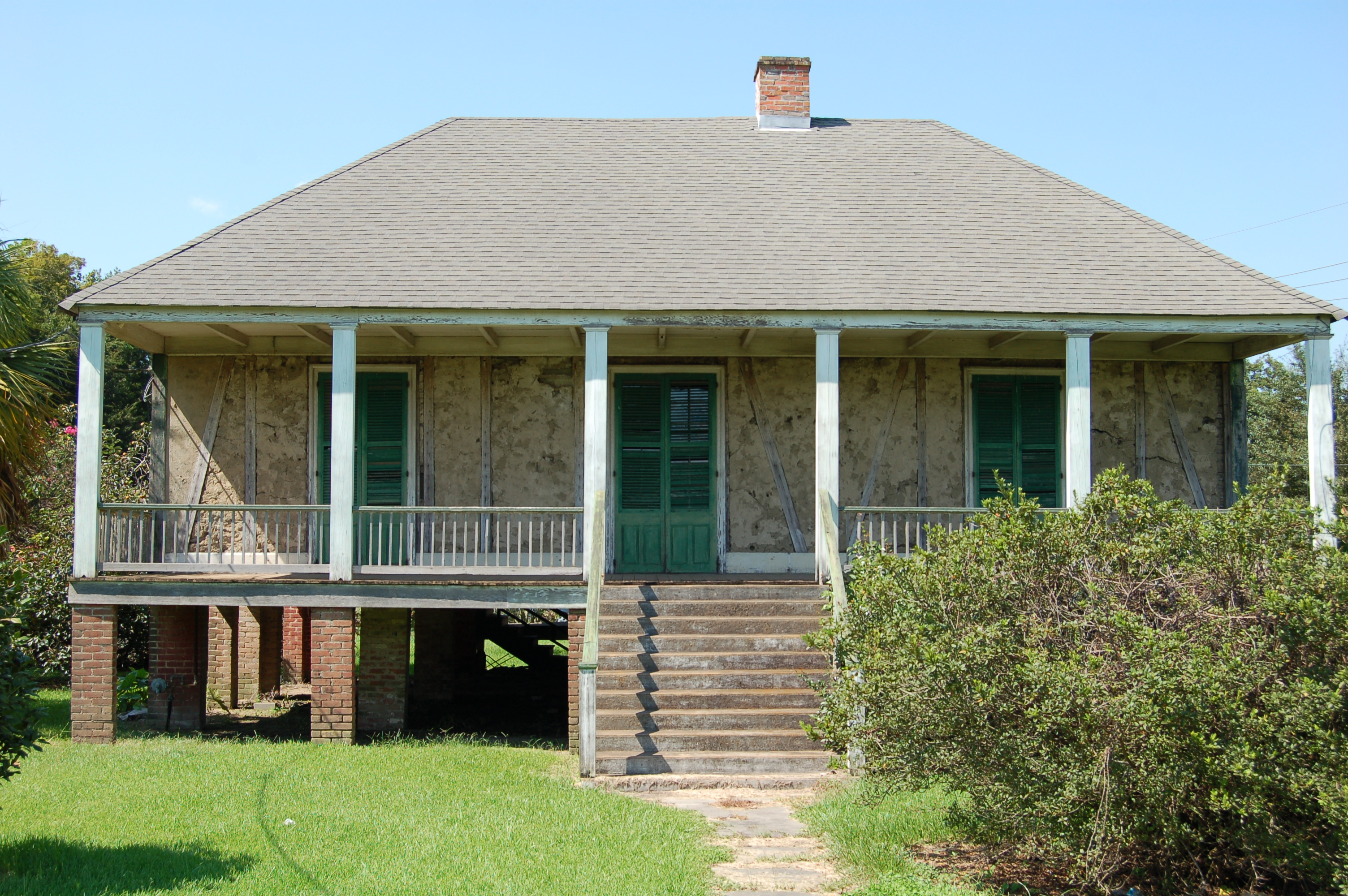
- The house in 2014

- Location within Louisiana Location within the United States
- Location: 423 East Jefferson Highway, Gramercy, Louisiana 70052
- Coordinates: 30°02′39″N 90°41′08″W
- Built: 1830
- Architectural style: Creole cottage, French colonial architecture.
- MPS: Louisiana's French Creole Architecture MPS
- NRHP reference No.: 99001478
- Added to NRHP: December 9, 1999

The Millet House is a historic Creole cottage on the east bank of the Mississippi River in what is now Gramercy, Louisiana. It was built around 1830 and added to the National Register of Historic Places in 1999 as part of a Multiple Property Submission.

== History ==
Jean Millet, an Acadian, moved to Louisiana prior to 1776 and the family owned the property on which the house sites by 1823. The family continued to live in the house for over a century, until 1950. While the house was built after the Louisiana Purchase, it exhibits influences of French colonial architecture.

== Architecture ==
The house has many hallmarks of a Creole architecture cottage style including an umbrella roof, a high brick pier foundation, and a wraparound mantel. The construction techniques also added to the historic value including briquette-entre-poteaux (brick-between-post) colombage walls made with bousillage.

== See also ==
- Mather House: another Creole cottage in St. James Parish
- National Register of Historic Places listings in St. James Parish, Louisiana
