= Charles F. Schweinfurth =

American architect

Charles Schweinfurth
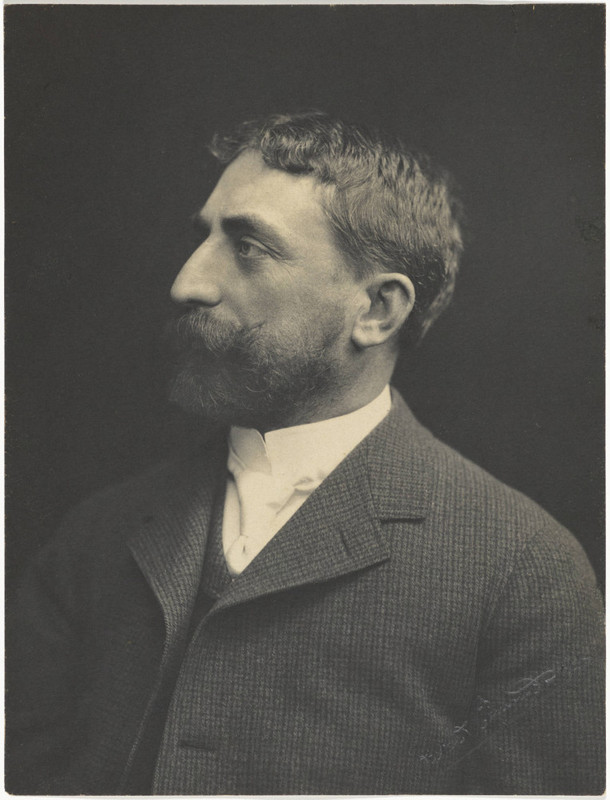
- Born: September 3, 1857; Auburn, New York, U.S.
- Died: November 8, 1919 (aged 62); Cleveland, Ohio, U.S.
- Occupation: Architect
- Spouses: Mary Ella Griggs (m. 1879; died 1903) Anna Jopling (m. 1910)
- Relatives: A. C. Schweinfurth (brother); Julius A. Schweinfurth (brother)

Charles Frederick Schweinfurth (September 3, 1857 – November 8, 1919) was an American architect in Cleveland, Ohio. His brother Julius Schweinfurth was also an architect and they did some projects as a partnership.

== Background ==
Schweinfurth was born in Auburn, New York to Charles J. and Katharine (Ammon) Schweinfurth. He graduated from Auburn High School in 1872 and worked at architectural offices in New York City.

== Cleveland career ==
Schweinfurth moved to Cleveland to design Sylvester T. Everett’s Euclid Avenue mansion. It would be the first of at least 15 he designed on "Millionaire's Row" by 1910.

The 23-room mansion Schweinfurth designed for Samuel Livingston Mather II in Bratenahl, Ohio was built in 1890 is now the Shoreby Club.

Schweinfurth was also responsible for the designs of remodels at the Old Stone Church, Calvary Presbyterian Church, and Trinity Cathedral and Parish House. He was also the architect for four "landmark" stone bridges crossing Martin Luther King Boulevard, his own residence on East 75th Street, declared a Historical Architectural Landmark in 1974 by the Cleveland Landmarks Commission.

Several works by Charles and/or Julius Schweinfurth survive and are listed on the U.S. National Register of Historic Places.

== Projects ==
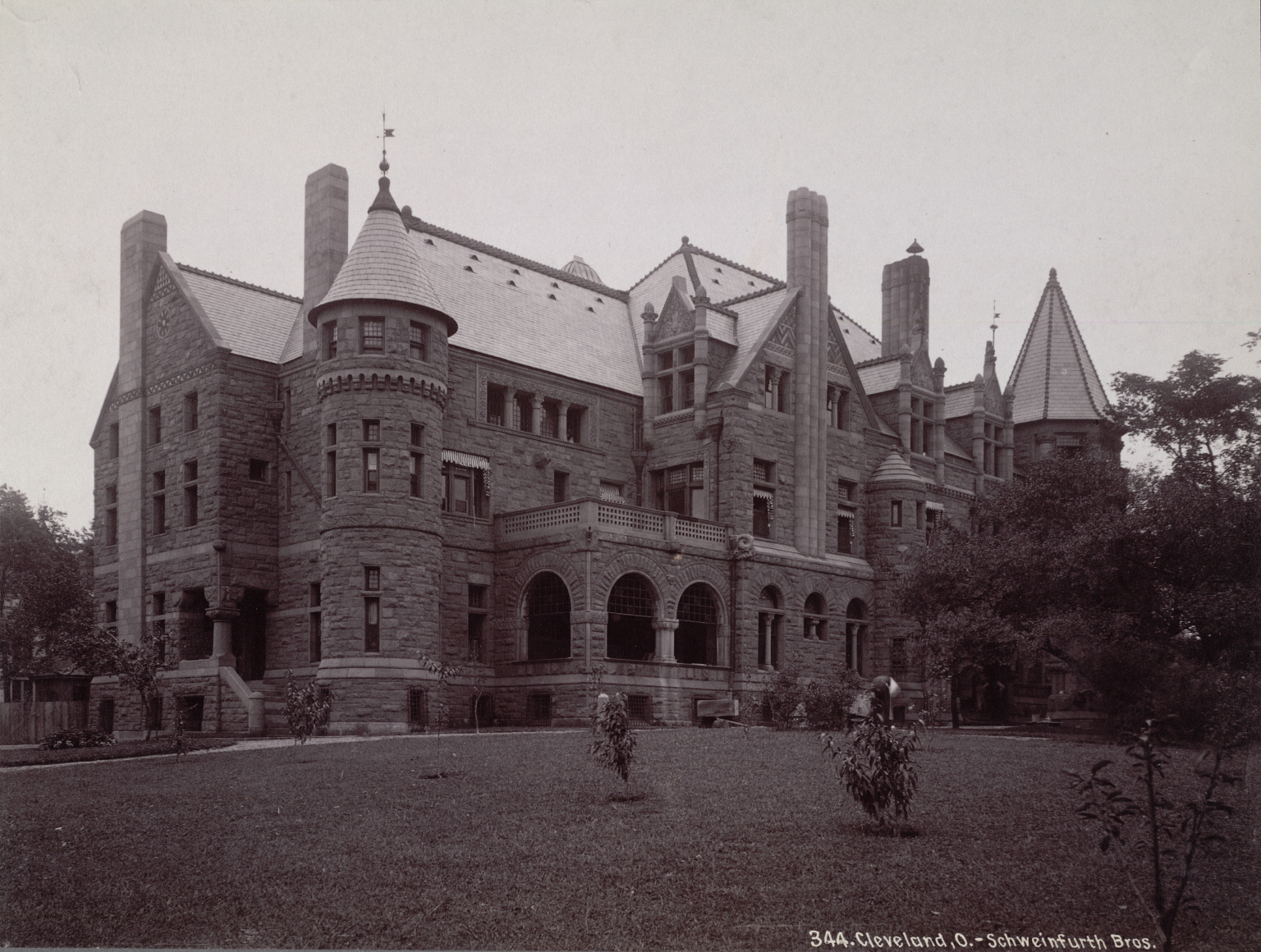
Sylvester T. Everett mansion, looking from the back of the property, on Euclid Avenue (since demolished)

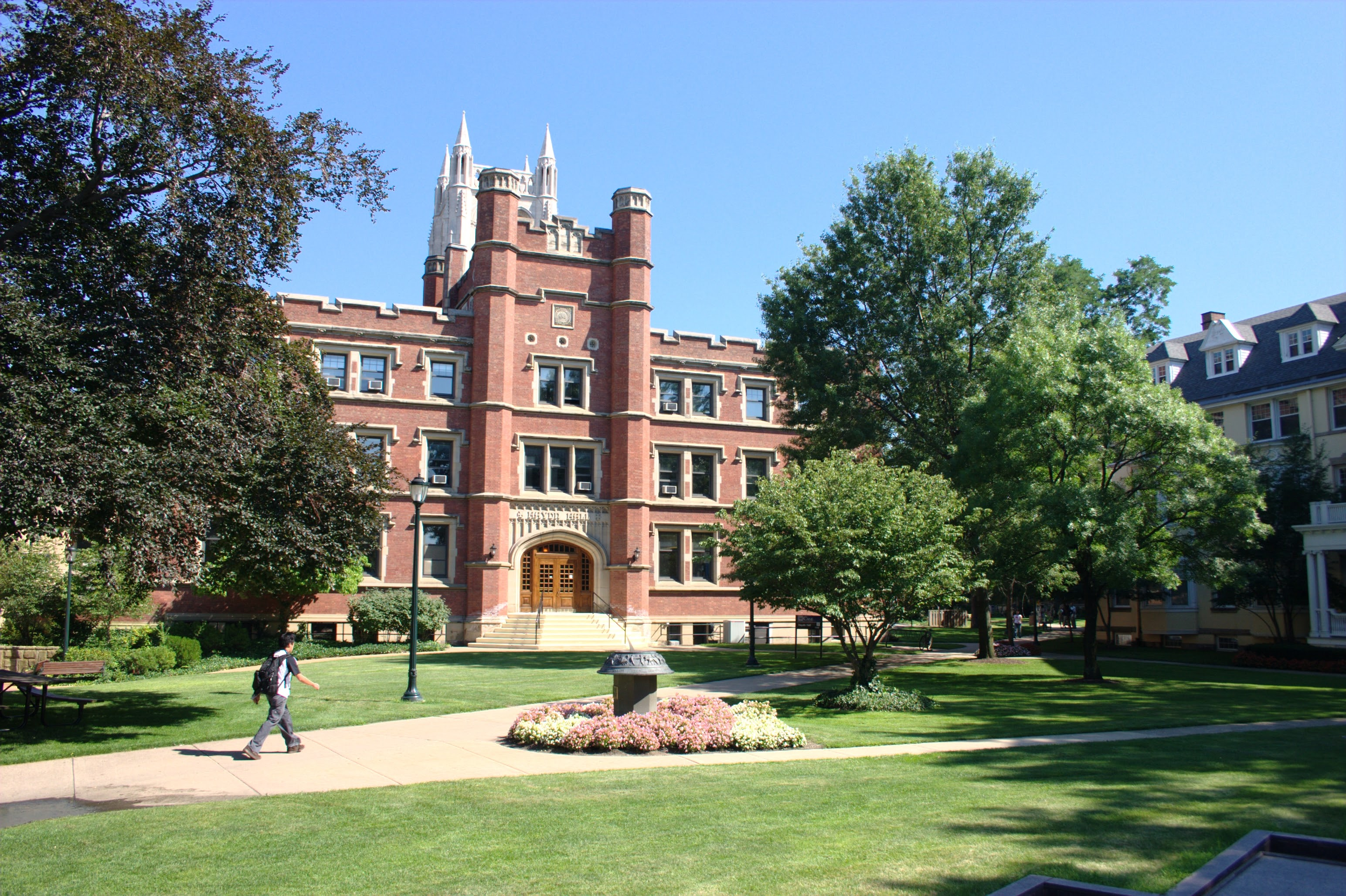
Haydn Hall

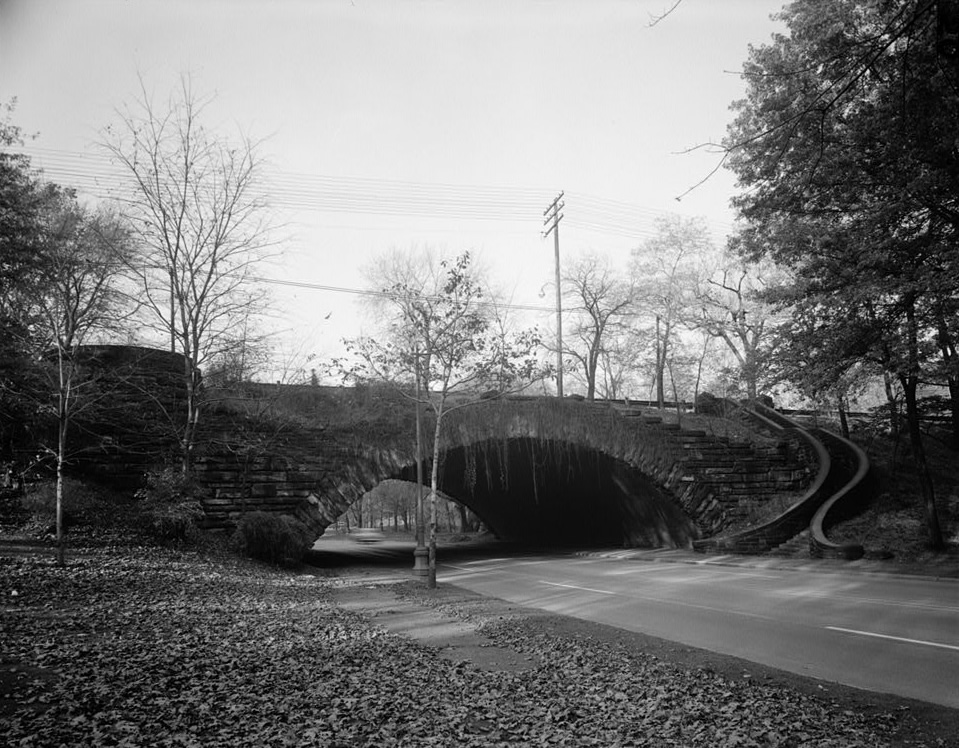
Wade Park Avenue Bridge over Martin Luther King Boulevard in Cleveland's Rockefeller Park

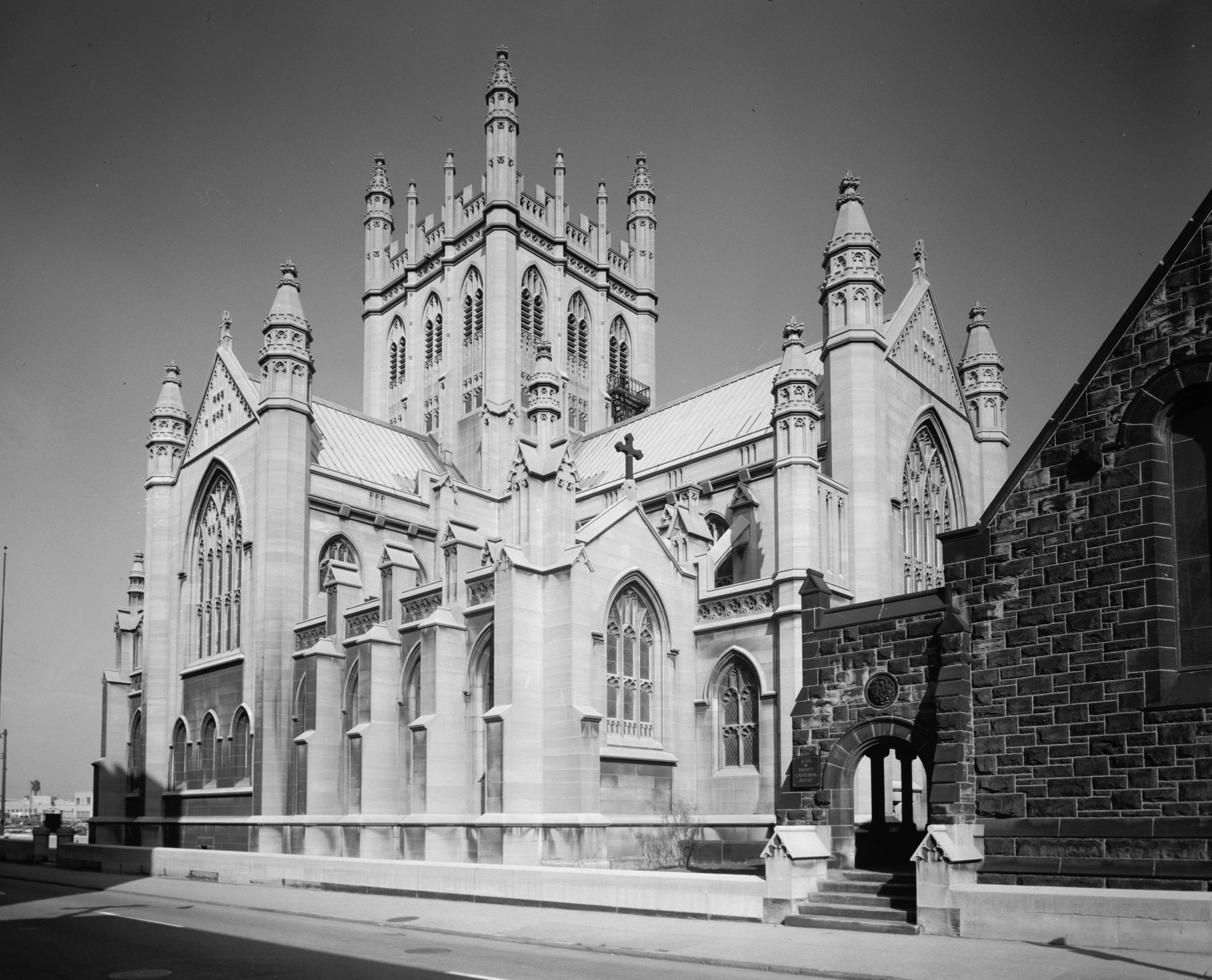
Trinity Cathedral (Cleveland, Ohio)

- At least 15 mansions on Euclid Avenue /Millionaire's Row) including:
  - Mather Mansion (1906–10) (now University Hall at Cleveland State University), a 43-room Tudor mansion built for iron-mining millionaire Samuel Livingston Mather II. The property included sunken gardens. Completed in 1910 at a cost of $1,200,000, it was the most expensive home in Cleveland to that point in time. It was also used as the Cleveland Institute of Music until 1940 and then by the Cleveland Automobile Club until 1967 when it was purchased by Cleveland State University. Located at 2605 Euclid Ave.
- Shoreby in Bratenahl, Ohio (now the Shoreby Club)
- Flora Stone Mather Memorial Hall (1910–13), Case Western Reserve University 11220 Bellflower Rd. Flora Stone was Samuel Livingston Mather II's wife.
- Old Stone Church (restoration 1884), designed reconstruction of interior after a fire, located at 91 Public Square, Heard & Porter designed the original (1853–55)
- Backus School of Law (1896) at Case Western Reserve University 2145 Adelbert Rd.
- Calvary Presbyterian Church (1887–90), 2020 East 79th St.
- Rockefeller Park Bridges over Martin Luther King, Jr. Drive (1897–1900), at Lake Shore & Michigan Southern Railroad, St. Clair Ave., Superior Ave., Wade Park Ave.
- Florence Harkness Memorial Chapel (1901–02) at Case Western Reserve University, 11200 Bellflower Rd. The neo-Gothic building includes antique oak and Georgia pine woodwork and Louis Comfort Tiffany windows.
- Haydn Hall (1901–02) also at Case Western Reserve University
- Trinity Baptist Church, (1904) 224 South Main Street, Marion, Ohio.
- Cuyahoga County Courthouse (1909–12), designed by Lehman and Schmitt with Charles F. Schweinfurth at 1 Lakeside Ave., NE
- "Old Main" building at Case School of Applied Science (Largely destroyed by fire)
- Five Oaks, 210 4th St., NE., Massillon, Ohio (Schweinfurth, Charles F.), NRHP-listed
- Charles Schweinfurth House, 1951 E. 75th St., Cleveland (Schweinfurth, Charles), NRHP-listed
- Trinity Cathedral Euclid Ave. at E. 22nd St., Cleveland (Schweinfurth, Charles), NRHP-listed
- Union Club, 1211 Euclid Ave., Cleveland (Schweinfurth, Charles F.), NRHP-listed

The Schweinfurth Collection today is part of the Cleveland Public Library in downtown Cleveland.

Other NRHP-listed works by Charles and/or Julius include (with attribution):

- Old Stone Church, 91 Public Sq., Cleveland, OH (Schweinfurth, Charles), NRHP-listed
- Rockefeller Park Bridges, Rockefeller Park, Cleveland, OH (Schweinfurth, Charles F.), NRHP-listed
- Trinity Cathedral Church Home, 2227 Prospect Ave., Cleveland, OH (Schweinfurth, Charles F.), NRHP-listed
- University Hall, Cleveland State University aka Mather Mansion, 2605 Euclid Ave., Cleveland, OH (Schweinfurth, Charles F.), NRHP-listed

== Legacy ==
Schweinfurth is buried at Fort Hill Cemetery in Auburn, New York.
