= Campus District =

District in Cleveland, Ohio, US

Coordinates: 41°29′52″N 81°40′12″W

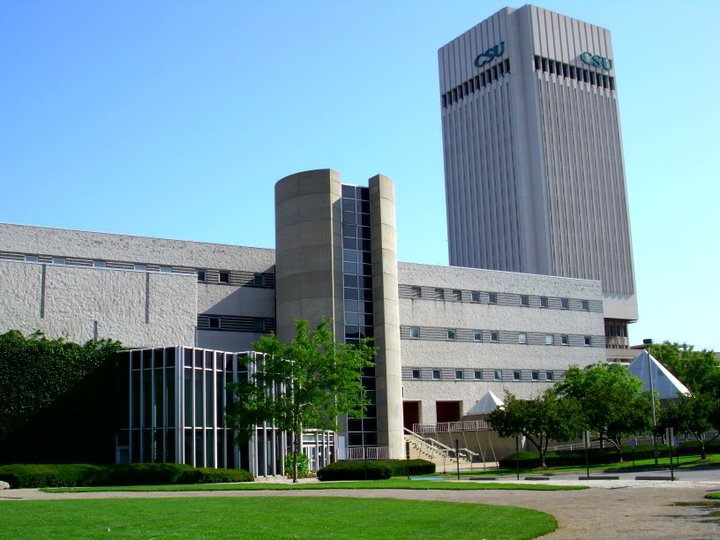
School of Communication at CSU with the Rhodes Tower in background

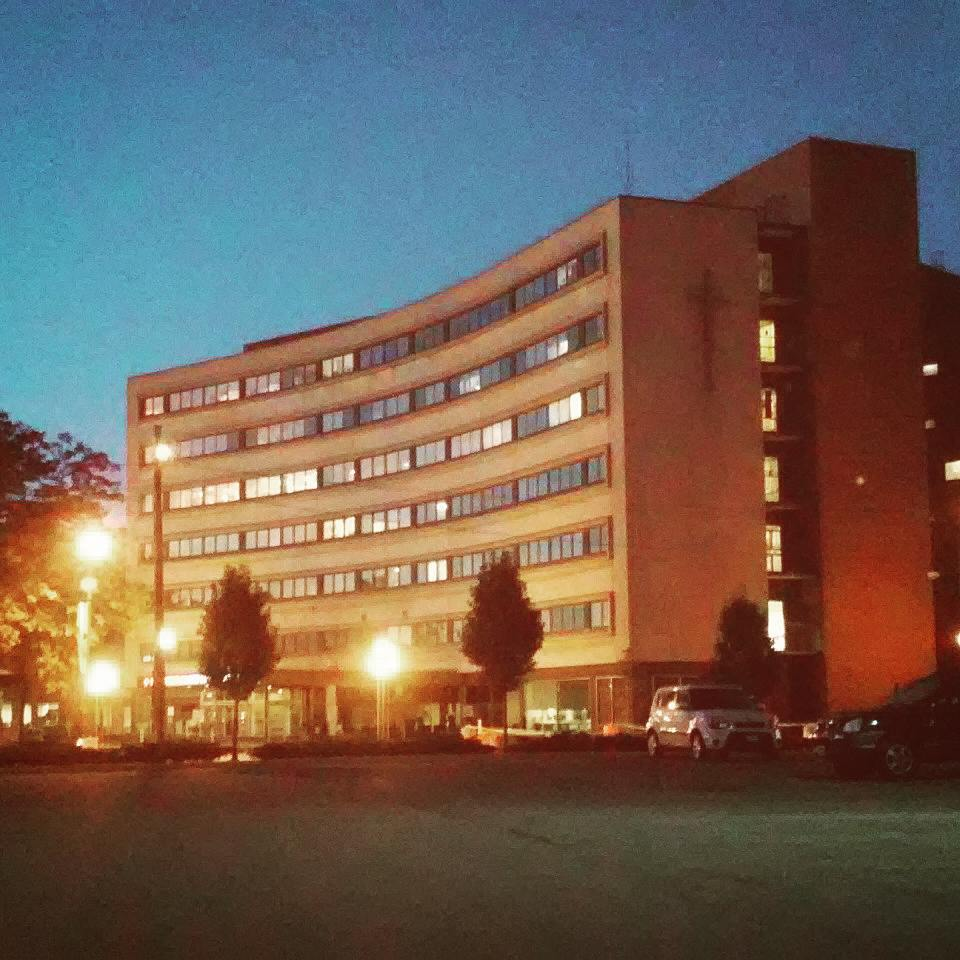
St.Vincent's Charity Medical Center at dusk

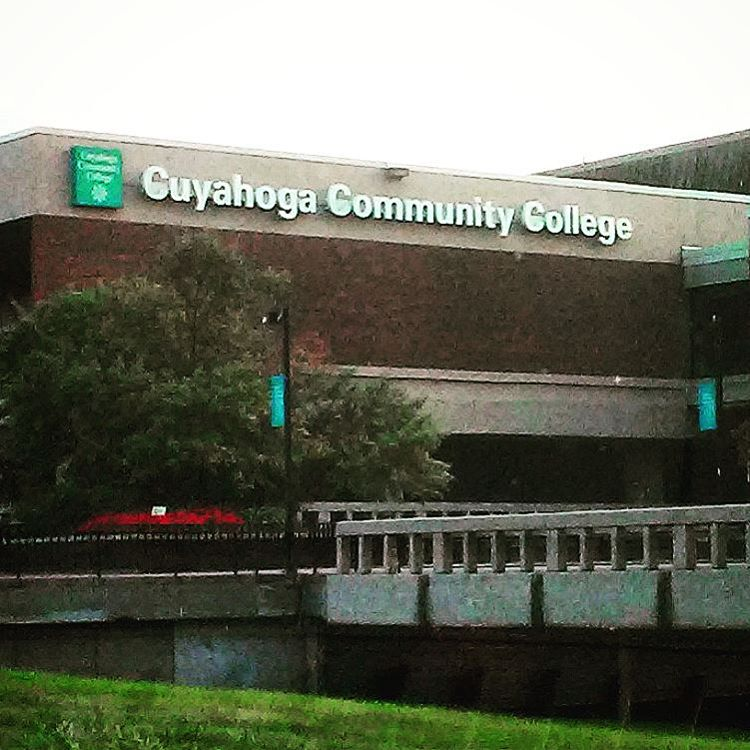
Cuyahoga Community College Metropolitan Campus

The Campus District is a Downtown Cleveland, Ohio district that includes the campuses of Cleveland State University, St. Vincent Charity Medical Center, and the Cuyahoga Community College (Tri-C) Metro Campus. Definitions of the district vary. According to the Cleveland City Planning Commission, the district is bounded by Payne Avenue to the north, East 17th Street to the west, and Interstate 90 to the south and east, forming the boundary between Downtown and Cleveland's Central neighborhood. However, the Campus District association places the western boundary of the district to East 18th Street and the eastern boundary further east, to East 30th Street, including Tri-C, with Interstate 77 to the south.

Cleveland State University is positioned centrally within the district, located along Euclid Avenue. According to the Campus District association definition, Tri-C is located in the southern portion of the district, at East 30th and Community College Avenue and St. Vincent Charity Medical Center is located along East 22nd Street, south of Interstate 90.

The District is also home to the Northeast Ohio Medical University at Cleveland State University, The Care Alliance Central Neighborhood Clinic, and the Rock and Roll Hall of Fame and Museum Archives. In addition, the Ohio Technical College campus sits just to the north of the district.

The major streets in the district are Superior Avenue, Payne Avenue, Chester Avenue, Euclid Avenue, Carnegie Avenue, East 22nd Street, Community College Drive, and East 30th Street.

Also, located in this area is one of the last remaining millionaire's row of Cleveland houses left standing, Mather Mansion.
