= Abram Garfield =

American architect (1872–1958)

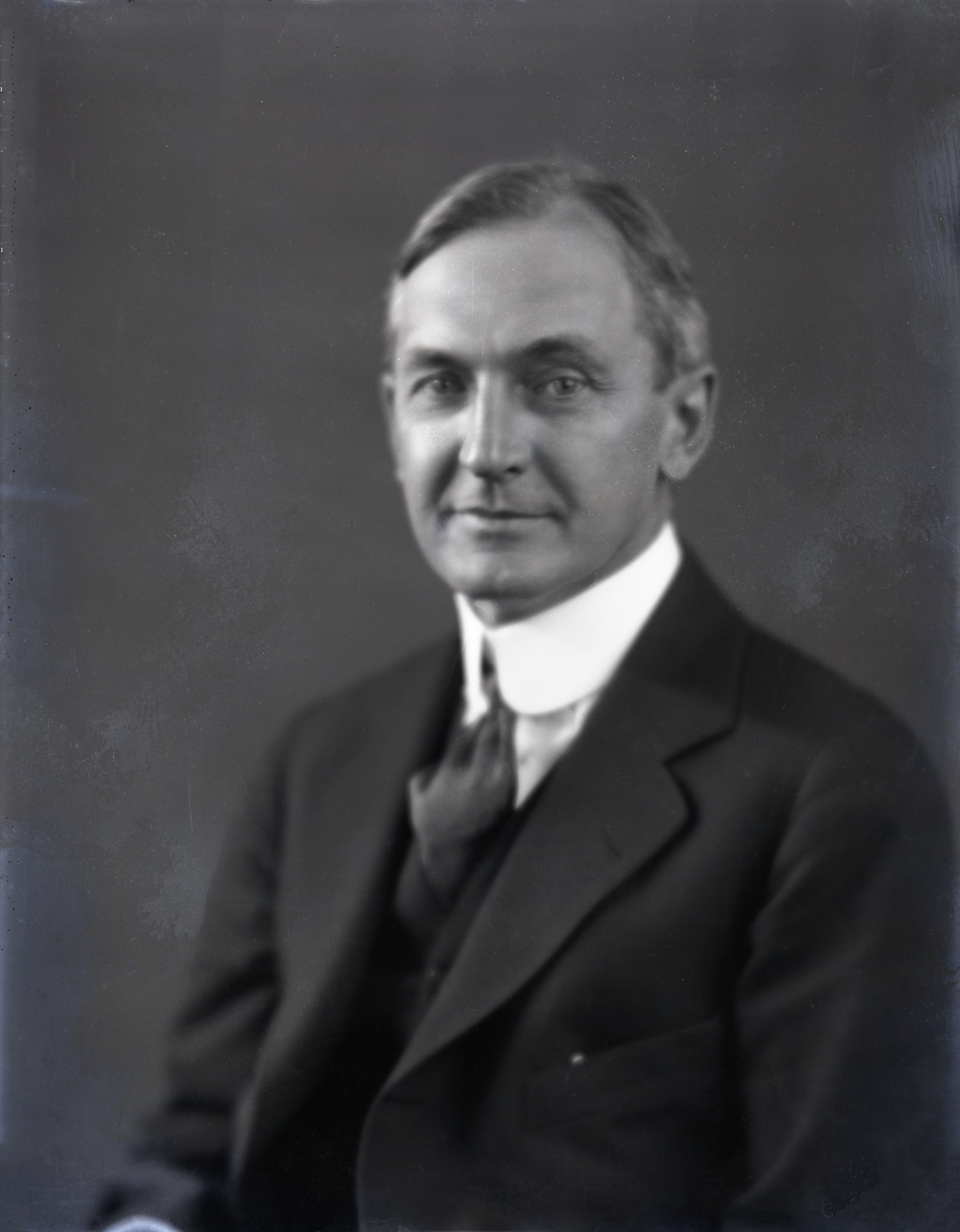
- Garfield in 1919
- Born: November 21, 1872; Washington, D.C., U.S.
- Died: October 16, 1958 (aged 85); Cleveland, Ohio, U.S.
- Resting place: Lake View Cemetery; Cleveland, Ohio, U.S.
- Education: Williams College (BA); Massachusetts Institute of Technology (BS)
- Occupation: Architect
- Employer(s): Meade & Garfield
- Spouses: Sarah Grainger Williams (m. 1897; died 1945) Helen Grannis Mathews (m. 1947)
- Children: 2
- Parents: James A. Garfield (father); Lucretia Garfield (mother)
- Relatives: Harry Augustus Garfield (brother); James Rudolph Garfield (brother); Mollie Garfield (sister)

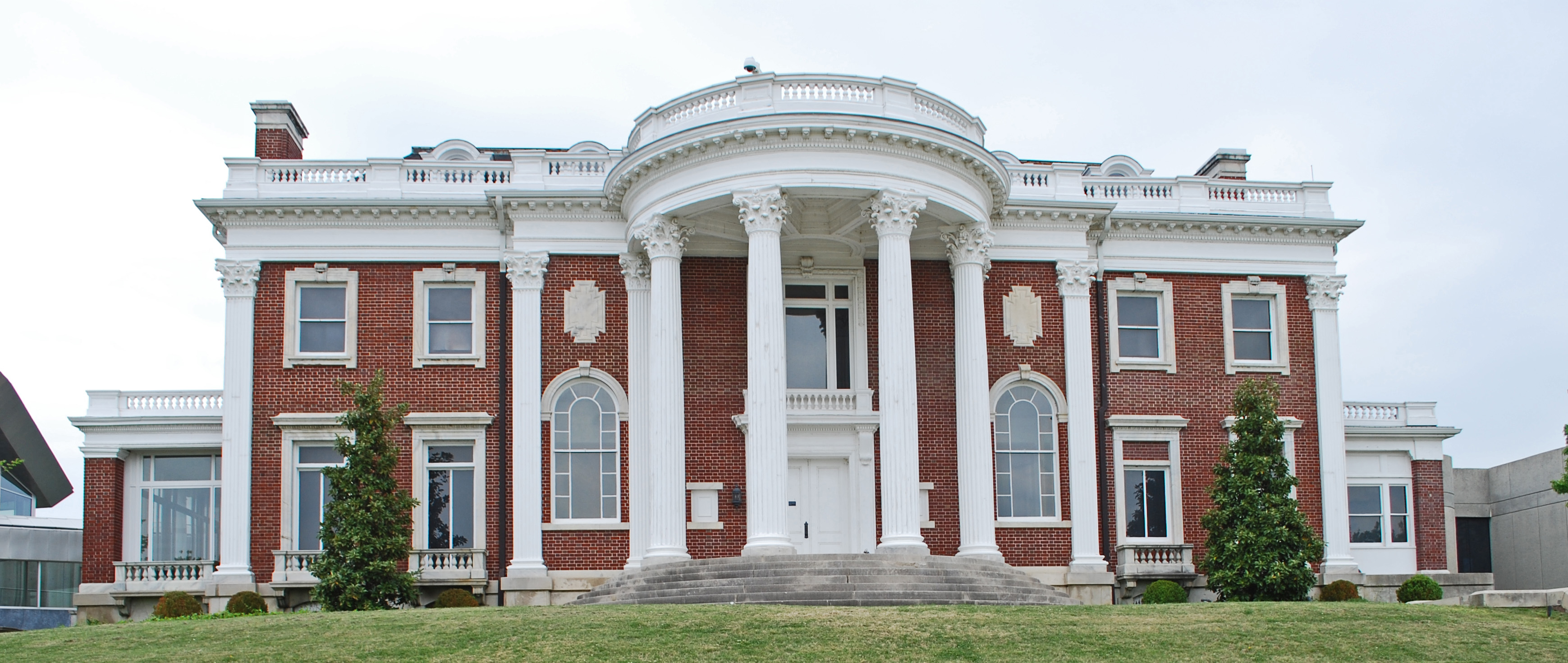
Faxon-Thomas Mansion, now the Hunter Museum of Art

Abram Garfield (November 21, 1872 – October 16, 1958) was an architect who practiced in Cleveland, Ohio. He was the sixth child and fourth son of President James A. Garfield and Lucretia Rudolph Garfield, and the youngest to survive infancy. He designed prominent residences and other buildings. A number of his works are listed on the National Register of Historic Places.

== Early life ==
Abram Garfield was born in Washington D.C. In 1876 the family moved to what is now the James A. Garfield National Historic Site in Mentor, Ohio. Garfield received a Bachelor of Arts from Williams College in Williamstown, Massachusetts in 1893 and a Bachelor of Science in architecture from the Massachusetts Institute of Technology in Cambridge, Massachusetts three years later. He lived at 9718 Lake Shore Boulevard in Bratenahl.

== Career ==
He began work as an architect in 1897, and in 1898 formed Meade & Garfield with Frank Meade in Cleveland, Ohio; the firm was noted for its premier residential designs. When the partnership ended in 1905, Garfield opened his own firm. In 1926, he along with Rudolph Stanley-Brown, George R. Harris, and Alexander Robinson started an architectural practice. In 1935 it was renamed Garfield, Harris, Robinson and Schafer until Garfield’s death in 1958. The firm, which still exists, was known as Westlake, Reed, Leskosky Architects until 2016 when purchased by DLR group.

Garfield specialized in residential architecture, designing large houses in Shaker Heights and other Cleveland suburbs, but his work also included more modest houses for the Cleveland Metropolitan Housing Authority and institutional projects such as schools and a hospital. Garfield served as chairman of the Cleveland Planning Commission from 1930 to 1942 and was a founder and first president of the Cleveland School of Architecture, which became part of Western Reserve University in 1941. He was named a trustee of the university that year and two years later was made an honorary lifetime member of the board; he received an honorary doctorate from Western Reserve University in 1945. Garfield was also a director of the American Institute of Architects from 1919 to 1922 and served on the U.S. Commission of Fine Arts from 1925 to 1930, including as vice chairman from 1929 to 1930. In 1949 he was elected into the National Academy of Design as an Associate Academician. He lived in Bratenahl, Ohio. Garfield married Sarah Grainger Williams and together they had two children, Edward W. and Mrs. William R. Hallaran. After the death of his first wife, he remarried to Helen Matthews.

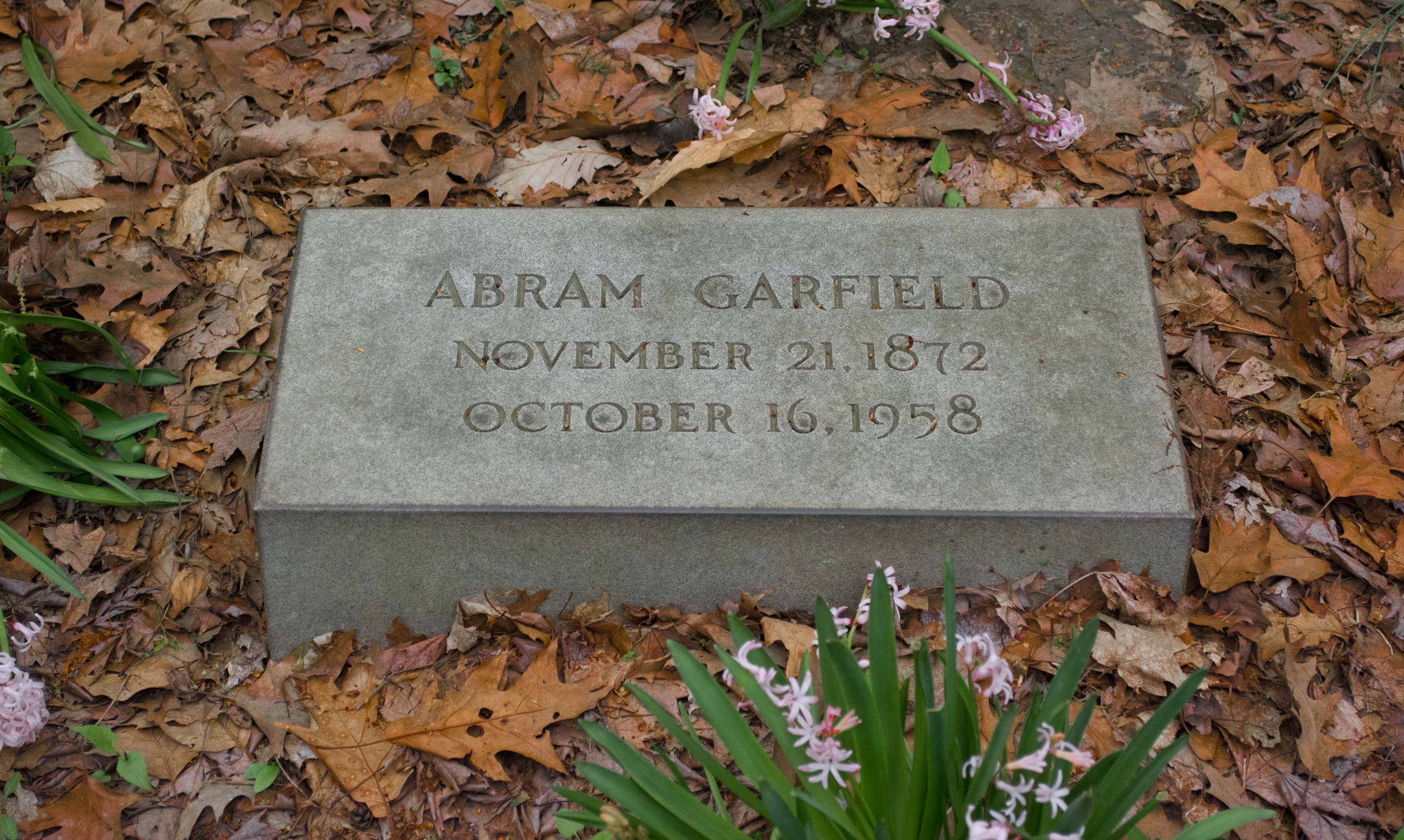
Grave of Abram Garfield at Lake View Cemetery in Cleveland, Ohio

Garfield died on October 16, 1958, at his home in Cleveland. He was the last surviving child of James Garfield. He was buried at Lake View Cemetery in Cleveland.

== Works ==
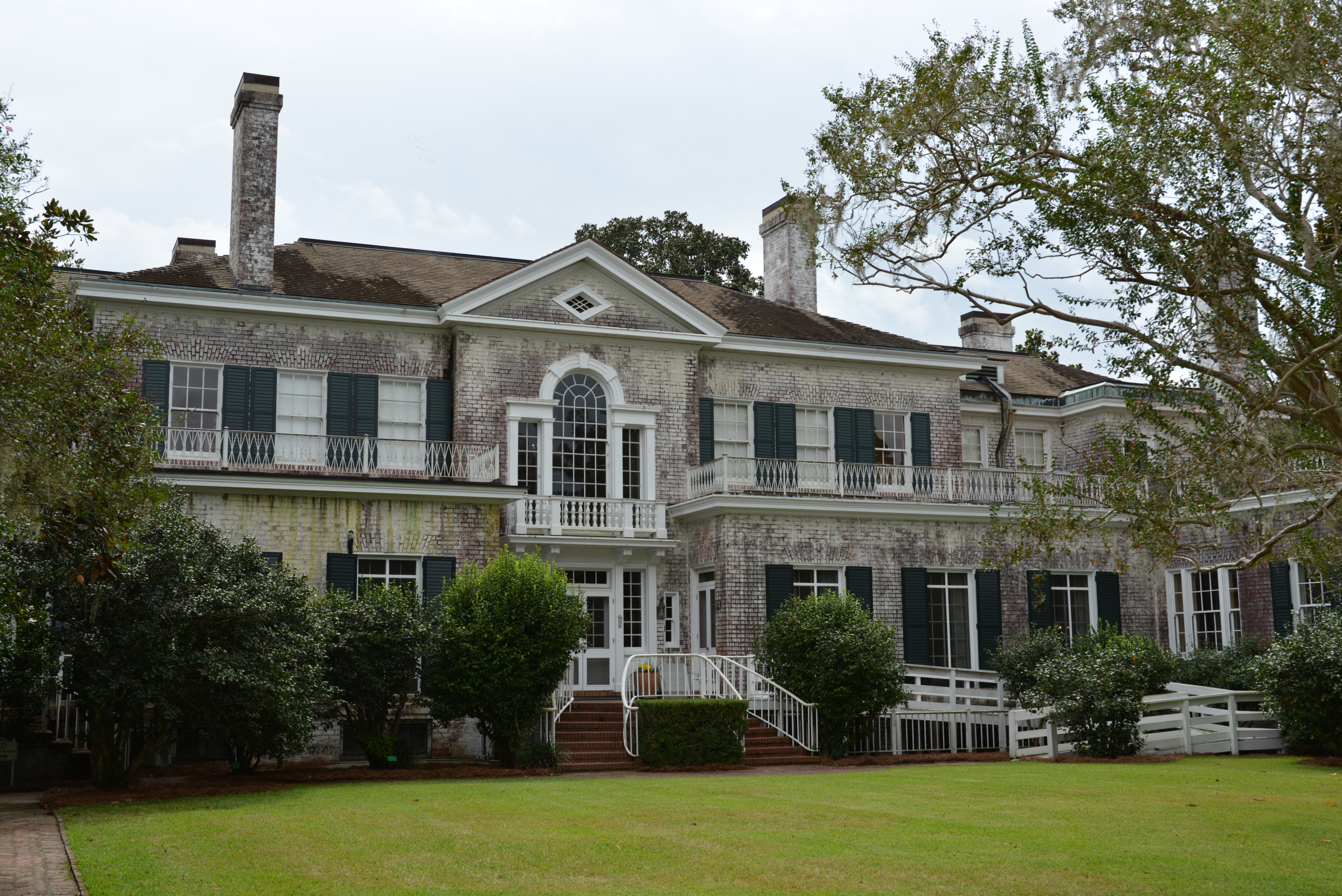
Pebble Hill Plantation

- Robert N. Pollock House (solo work) at 2446 Kenilworth Rd., Cleveland Heights, Ohio. Built 1897.
- W. H. Warner House (Warner-Racca House) at 2689 East Overlook Rd, Cleveland Heights, Ohio. Built 1898. Includes a French Chateaux-inspired circular staircase and ornate chimneys.
- Jerome Zerbe-Samuel Halle House (Harcourt House) at 2163 Harcourt Drive in Cleveland Heights Ohio. Built 1905. Halle was part of Halle Brothers Co.
- Mather House at Case Western Reserve University, built 1913-1915
- Casa Apava, an estate built in 1918 for Chester C. Bolton and Frances P. Bolton on Ocean Boulevard in Palm Beach, Florida. After Ron Perelman sold this house and two adjoining properties to Dwight Schar in 2004 for a reported $70 million ($45 million for the house), Forbes magazine described this as "the most expensive home ever sold in the U.S." It was sold for $71.2 million in 2015.
- Elizabeth B. and Dudley S. Blossom Estate Service Compound, 24449 Cedar Rd. Lyndhurst, Ohio (Garfield, Abram), NRHP-listed
- Faxon-Thomas Mansion, now the Hunter Museum of American Art, 10 Bluff View Ave. Chattanooga, Tennessee (Garfield, Abram), NRHP-listed
- Garfield Library, 7300 Center St. Mentor, Ohio (Garfield, Abram), NRHP-listed
- The Hangar, 24400 Cedar Rd. Beachwood, Ohio (Garfield, Abram), NRHP-listed
- The College Club of Cleveland/Alexander House, 2348 Overlook Rd., Cleveland Heights, Ohio built 1904.
- Hay-McKinney and Bingham-Hanna House, now the Western Reserve Historical Society, 10825 East Blvd. Cleveland, Ohio (Garfield, Abram), NRHP-listed
- Jared A. Smith House, 2541 Kenilworth Rd., Cleveland Heights, Ohio built 1898.
- John G. Oliver House, 7645 Little Mountain Rd. Mentor, Ohio (Garfield, Abram), NRHP-listed
- Leonard Hall, a dormitory at Kenyon College. Built in 1924.
- Pebble Hill Plantation, US 319, 4 miles (6.4 km) southwest of Thomasville Thomasville, Georgia (Garfield, Abram), NRHP-listed
- Helen Rockwell Morley Memorial Music Building at Lake Erie College in Painesville, Ohio

== See also: ==
- List of children of presidents of the United States
