= Landmark Inn =

Historic hotel in Marquette, Michigan, United States

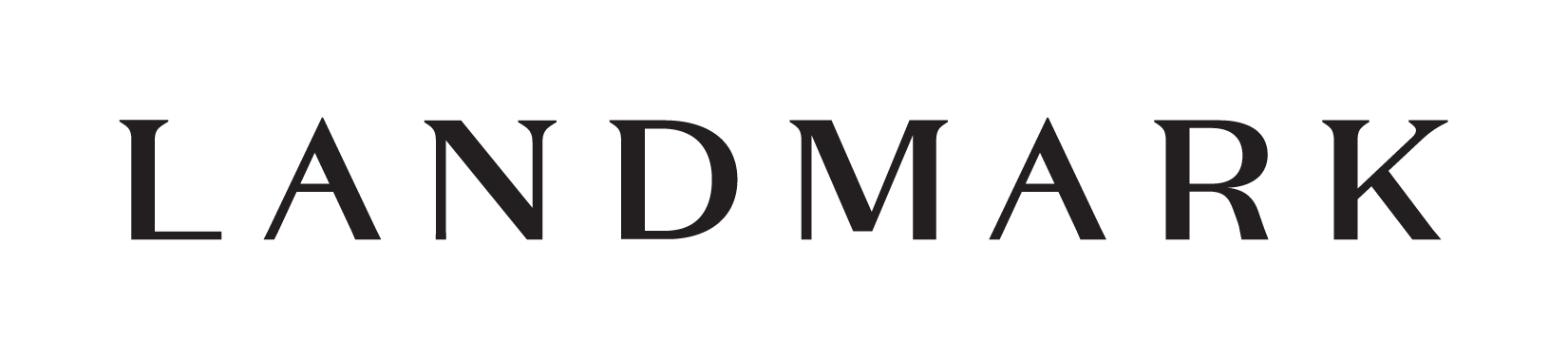

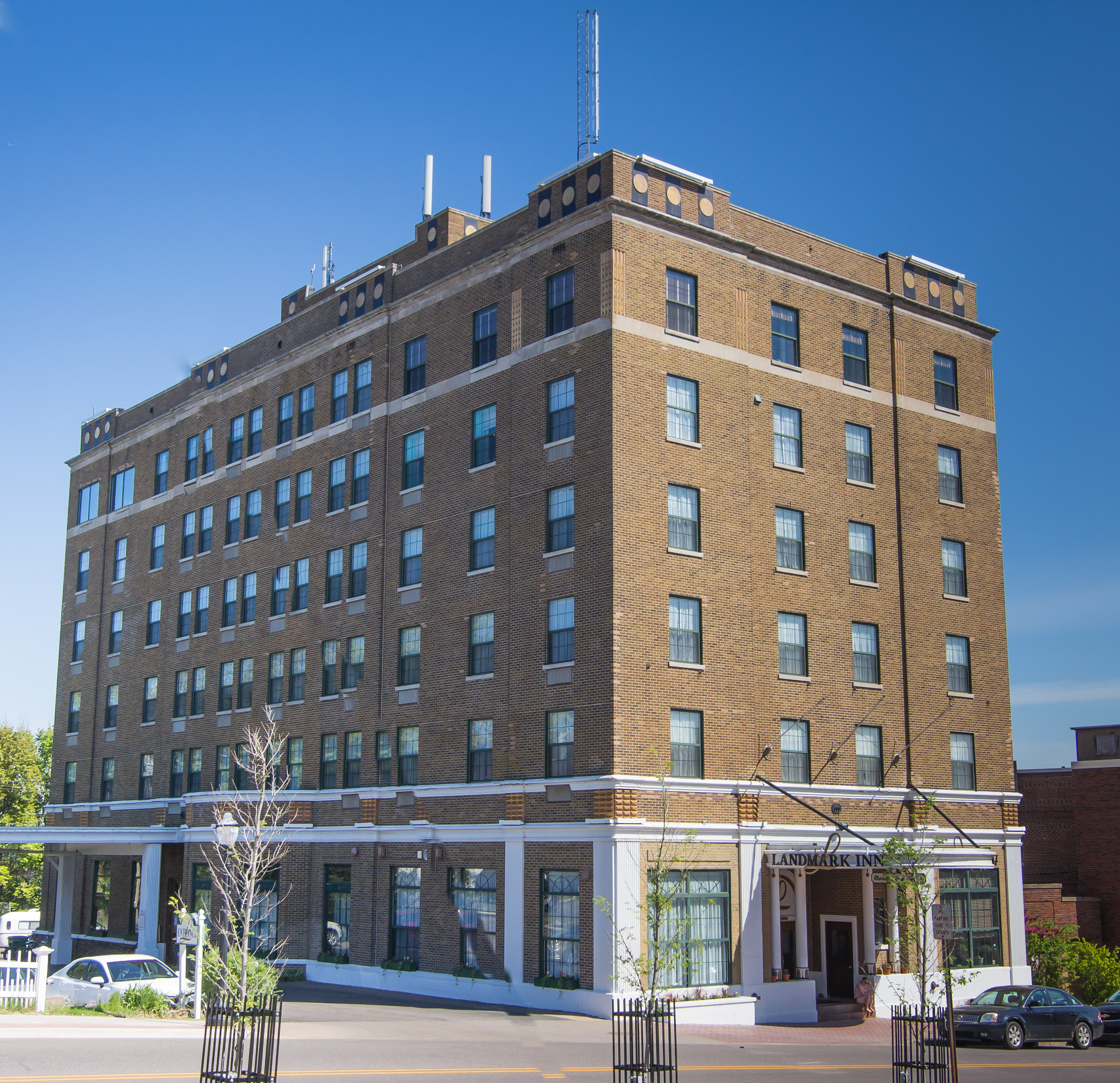
- Former names: Hotel Northland; Heritage House; Old Marquette Inn

General information
- Location: Marquette, Michigan, 230 North Front Street
- Coordinates: 46.545°N 87.392°W
- Construction started: 1917
- Completed: 1930
- Opened: 1930
- Renovated: 1995–97
- Owner: Graves Hospitality Management

Height
- Height: 6 stories

Design and construction
- Architect: Samuel Shackford Otis

Website
- thelandmarkinn.com

The Landmark Inn is a historic hotel on Front Street in downtown Marquette, Michigan. The hotel originally opened in 1930 as the Hotel Northland. As it originally did, the hotel operates as a full-service hotel with 66 rooms, many of which overlook the shores of Lake Superior.

== History ==
Building plans and concept work on the hotel started in June 1916 and were overseen by Samuel Shackford Otis. Construction on Hotel Northland began with foundation pouring in 1920 but was quickly halted due to lack of funding. After George Shiras III and the stockholders of the Kambawgam Hotel Co. had raised the $35,000 (equivalent to $516,000 in 2025) necessary to build the hotel, construction resumed 12 years later on April 1, 1929. Hotel Northland officially opened to guests on January 2, 1930.

It operated as a full-service hotel with 100 rooms until the 1970s, when it started falling apart. The hotel finally closed in 1982. Through the 1970s, the hotel fell into a severe state of disrepair. The deterioration of the building and a series of rapid name changes (including "Heritage House" in the mid-1970s and "Old Marquette Inn" in 1978) ultimately lead to its closure in 1982, after which it was considered abandoned.

In 1995, the hotel property was purchased by Christine and Bruce Pesola for $103,000 (equivalent to $198,000 in 2025) and in that same year, a complete renovation of the building began. After renovation efforts were finished in 1997, the newly restored hotel was reopened as the Landmark Inn.

In 1997 it was the first Michigan Hotel to be awarded membership in the Historic Hotels of America.

== Popular culture ==
This boutique hotel amalgamates modern comfort with "old-world elegance" in downtown Marquette. It offers Lake Superior views within a short walk to bars, restaurants. entertainment and museums. There are rooms named after the celebrities and historical figures who were guests. In 2002, The Rolling Stones gathered there before the funeral of their road manager.

Throughout its history, the hotel has hosted many celebrities and historical figures: Amelia Earhart in 1932, Abbott & Costello in 1942, comedian Bill Cosby, band leader Duke Ellington (see Mather Inn), Governor John Engler, astronaut Jerry M. Linenger, and Maya Angelou. The hotel also hosted the cast and crew of the film Anatomy of a Murder during filming in 1959.

The hotel is reported to be haunted.

== Current use ==
The hotel has been owned by Graves Hospitality Management since 2015. The Landmark Inn operates 66 rooms, many of which are now named in coordination to the celebrities and historical figures that have stayed in each respective room. For a number of years, the Landmark Inn was a member of Historic Hotels of America, the official program of the National Trust for Historic Preservation; the hotel left the program in 2016. Winter evenings are described as "cozy" by the fireplace " with a "an oversized live fir tree in its Grand Lobby and candlelit New Year’s Eve dinners."
