= William Mathers House =

- U.S. National Register of Historic Places
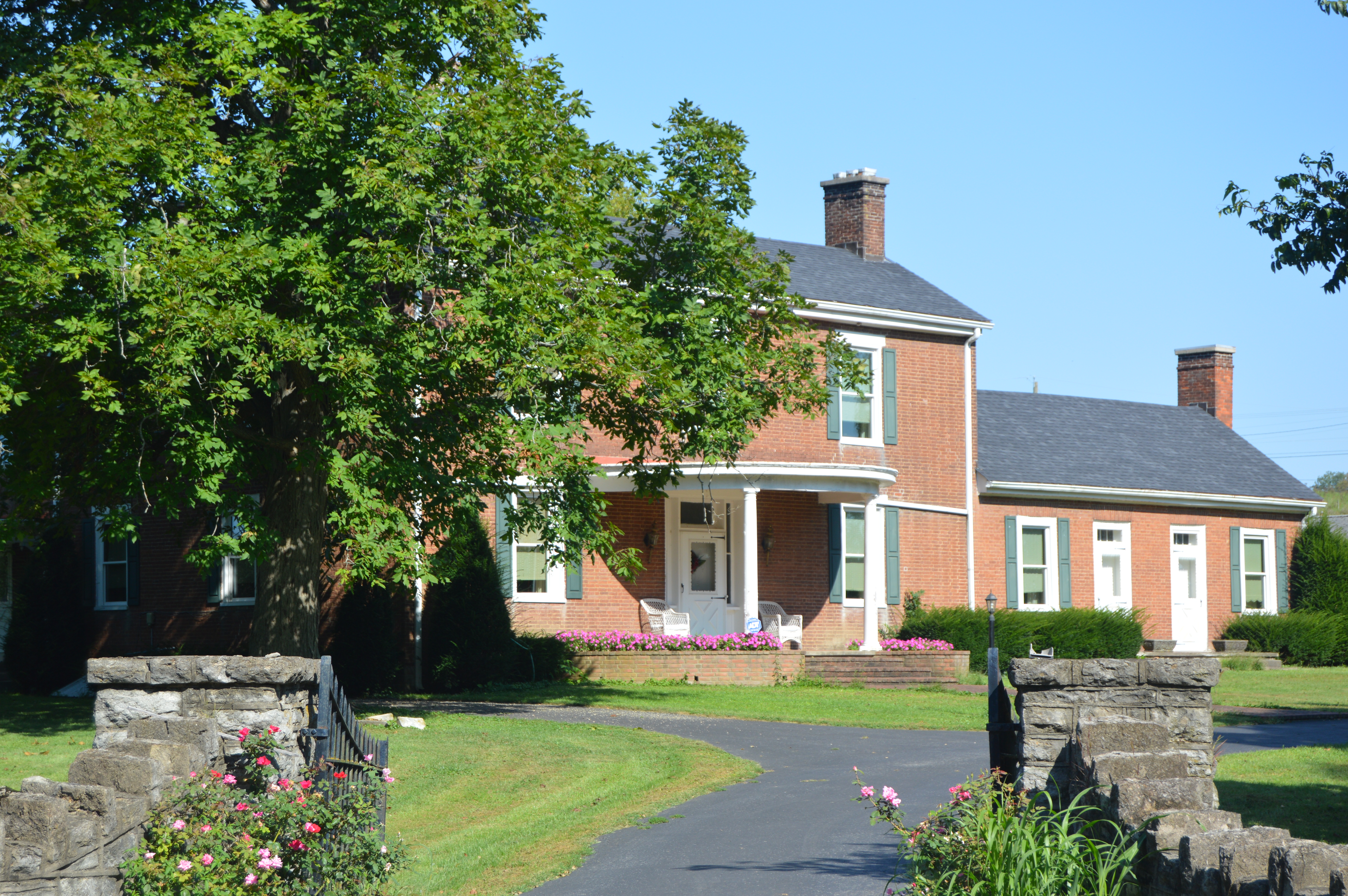

- Location within Kentucky Location within the United States
- Location: KY 36, near Carlisle, Kentucky
- Coordinates: 38°18′43″N 84°02′36″W
- Area: less than one acre
- Built: 1812, c.1858, 1920
- Architectural style: Greek Revival, Federal
- NRHP reference No.: 89001600
- Added to NRHP: October 12, 1989

The William Mathers House, on Kentucky Route 36 in Nicholas County, Kentucky near Carlisle, was started in 1812. It was listed on the National Register of Historic Places in 1989.

It includes elements of Greek Revival and Federal architecture.

It was started in 1812 by William Mathers as a two-room four-bay Federal-style brick building, with brick laid in Flemish bond. The bricks were fired on site, using clay brought about 10 miles from Pleasant Valley.

Around 1858 a two-story Greek Revival section, also using Flemish bond masonry, was added by William Mathers' son Barton W. Mathers. Around 1920 a Colonial Revival porch was added over the entrance to this section.
