= Mather House (Case Western Reserve University) =

Classroom building

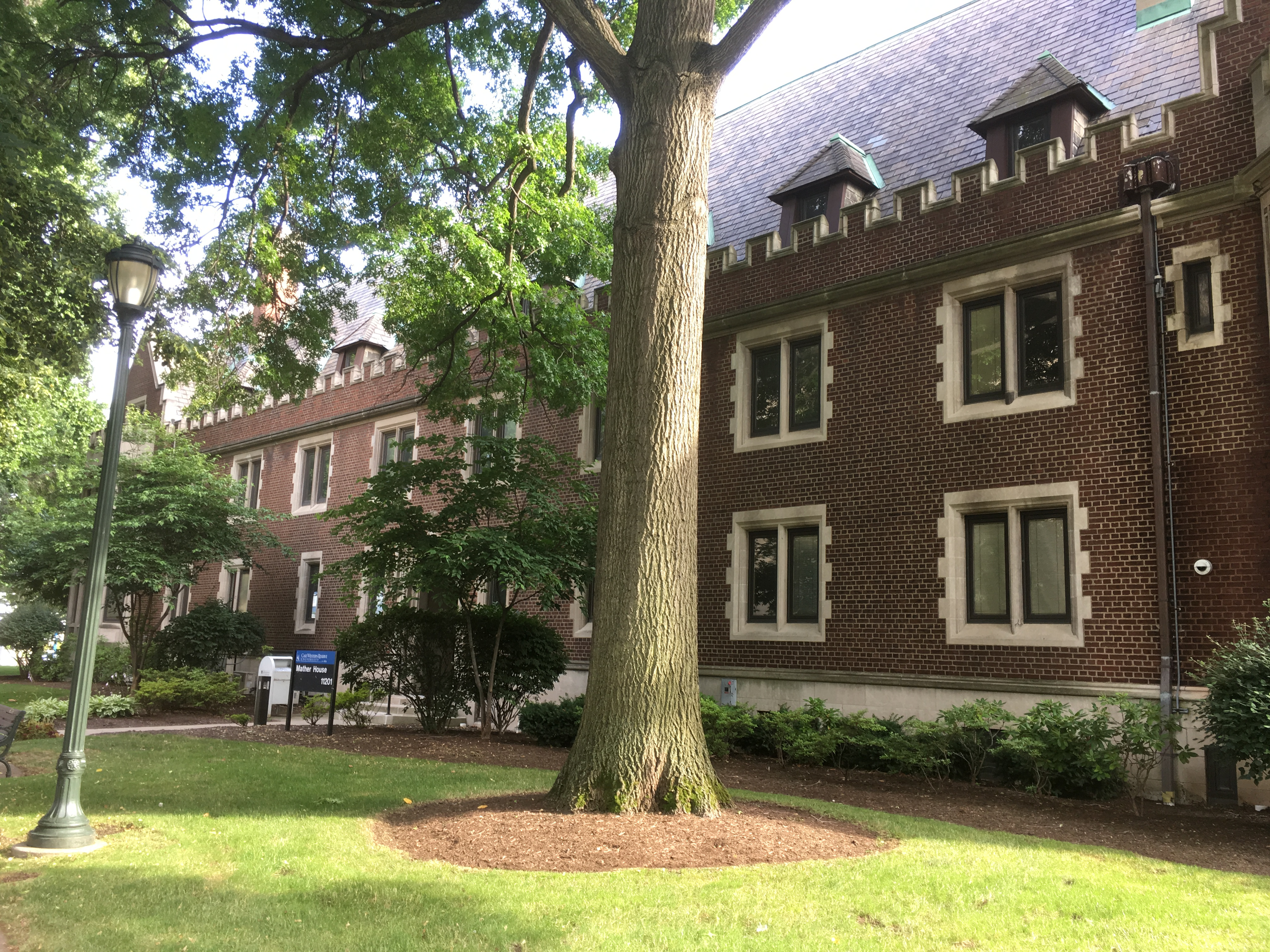
- Interactive map of the Mather House area
- Alternative names: Flora Mather House

General information
- Status: Completed
- Location: 11201 Euclid Avenue,, Cleveland, Ohio, United States
- Coordinates: 41°30′29.2″N 81°36′26.5″W
- Construction started: 1913
- Completed: 1915
- Owner: Case Western Reserve University

Design and construction
- Architect: Abram Garfield
- Main contractor: Roderick D. Grant

Mather House, formally named Flora Mather House, is a college building named for Flora Stone Mather at Case Western Reserve University in Cleveland, Ohio. It was built as a dormitory for the Flora Stone Mather College for Women of Western Reserve University, and currently houses classrooms and offices for the university's departments of art history, classics, history, and political science.

It was built during 1913–1915. It was designed by architect Abram Garfield and was built by contractor Roderick D. Grant. The building faces Euclid Avenue, sitting between the Church of the Covenant and Thwing Hall. It is within the Flora Stone Mather College Historic District, but is not counted among its contributing buildings.

It should not be confused with the Mather House that formerly stood nearby at 11100 Euclid Avenue, on the University Hospitals of Cleveland main campus. That building, originally a dormitory for nursing students and later occupied by clinics, was one of four structures (Harvey, Lowman, Mather, and Robb) demolished in 2007 for the construction of the Center for Emergency Medicine and a parking garage, part of the hospital system's Vision 2010 plan.
