= Mather, California =

Mather, California may refer to the following locations in the U.S. state of California:

- Sacramento Mather Airport, an airport in Sacramento County with the Mather post office
- Mather Air Force Base, a closed Air Force base on the site of Mather Airport
- Mather, Sacramento County, California, a census-designated place
- Mather, Tuolumne County, California, an unincorporated community in Tuolumne County
