= Mather House (Convent, Louisiana) =

Historic house in Louisiana, United States

- U.S. National Register of Historic Places
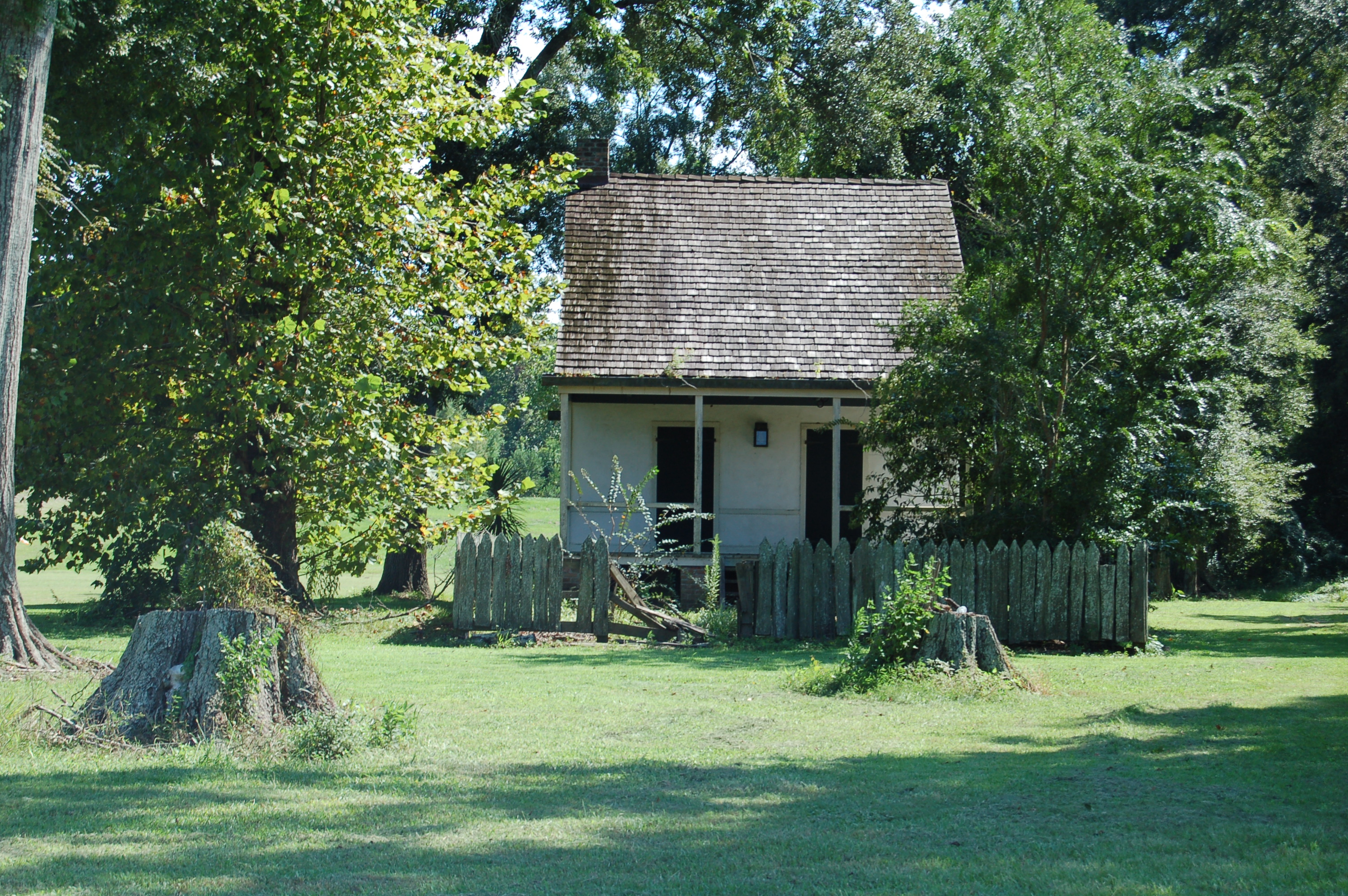

- Location within Louisiana Location within the United States
- Location: 5666 Hwy 44 (River Road), College Point (south of Convent, Louisiana), St. James Parish, Louisiana
- Coordinates: 29°59′45″N 90°48′48″W
- Area: less than one acre
- Built: c.1811
- Architectural style: French Creole
- MPS: Louisiana's French Creole Architecture MPS
- NRHP reference No.: 01000569
- Added to NRHP: May 30, 2001

The Mather House, also known as Breaux-Mather House, was built in 1811 in Convent, Louisiana. It was listed on the U.S. National Register of Historic Places in 2001.

It is a one-story French Creole frame cottage facing south onto River Road (Louisiana Highway 44), on the east (north) bank of the Mississippi River, in St. James Parish.

== See also ==
- Millet House: another Creole cottage in St. James Parish
- National Register of Historic Places listings in St. James Parish, Louisiana
