= Samuel Shackford Otis =

American architect

Samuel Shackford Otis (1891–1974) was an architect from Winnetka, Illinois, who designed numerous hotels, housing complexes, and other buildings during a nearly 40-year career. While working with H. L. Stevens & Company, Otis supervised hotel designs in six U.S. states (Alabama, Iowa, Michigan, Missouri, Mississippi, and Ohio). Serving as a supervising architect for the Works Progress Administration, he oversaw the design of housing complexes in Nebraska, Oklahoma, and Texas. Otis also served as an architect with the U.S. Fisheries and Wildlife Services (now the U.S. Fish and Wildlife Service).

== Early life and education ==
Samuel Otis was born in Chicago, on February 4, 1891, to William Augustus Otis and Elizabeth Lincoln Shackford. William Otis, a fellow of the American Institute of Architects, studied at the École des Beaux-Arts in Paris and lectured at the Art Institute of Chicago. He designed houses, schools, churches, and other buildings in Illinois and other states, including five Carnegie libraries. William Otis also designed several buildings for Northwestern University's main campus in Evanston, Illinois, including the Lunt Library (now Lunt Hall).

In 1910, Samuel Otis graduated from the Morristown School (now Morristown-Beard School) in Morristown, New Jersey. He then completed his bachelor's degree at Harvard University in Cambridge, Massachusetts, in 1914. While studying at Harvard, Otis worked as an associate editor and a cartoonist at the Harvard Lampoon, a humor magazine. He also took classes at the Massachusetts Institute of Technology. In May 1914, Otis won a competition to design the bookplate for the 1914 yearbook of Harvard University. Following his undergraduate studies, Otis took graduate courses at Harvard University's Graduate School of Architecture (now the Graduate School of Design) for two years. He later held membership in both the Harvard Club of New York City and the Harvard Club of Chicago.

== Winnetka Planning Commission and World War I Memorial ==
Otis served on Winnetka's first Plan Commission, which published the 1921 report that guided the village's early development. Winning an architectural competition, he also designed a war memorial for Winnetka to honor 10 soldiers who died in World War I. Otis later called the roll of dead at annual Memorial Day services held at the memorial.

Since World War I, the war memorial's curators have added bronze plaques to honor soldiers killed during World War II, the Vietnam War, and the Korean War. The memorial experienced deterioration from water ingress and freeze-thaw cycles. Addressing these issues, Robin Whitehurst of the firm Bailey Edward conducted restoration work to restore the memorial back to its original appearance. The Winnetka Landmark Preservation Commission awarded Robin Whitehurst a preservation award in 2009 to recognize his restoration.

== Patenting innovations ==
Otis held patents issued by the U.S. Patent and Trademark Office (USPTO) for cabinet construction and a knife rack and edger. In 1960, the USPTO published his patent for an automatic checking machine. As of 2014, 26 patents published since then have referenced Otis' patent, including multiple innovations in self checkout.

== Military service and civic service ==
After the U.S. entered World War I, Otis enlisted with the U.S. Naval Reserve at Naval Station Great Lakes. Training until October, he received a commission of ensign and a detachment to the submarine chasers group. Otis worked as a judge advocate general (JAG) officer during this period. He later served as the assistant navigator aboard the U.S.S. Hannibal, a warship converted from a private steamer. During his eight-year military career, Otis also served aboard the U.S.S. Parker, an Aylwin class destroyer, and the U.S.S. Castine, a gunboat.

Otis commanded the American Legion's post in Winnetka. He served as president of the North Shore Theatre Guild and vice president of Winnetka's Historical Society. Otis also served on the Chicago Metropolitan Housing Council and helped found the Indian Hill Club in Winnetka.

== Notable ancestry ==
Otis descended from several notable persons, including colonial magistrate Nathaniel Thomas, Samuel Lincoln (an ancestor of Abraham Lincoln), and Mayflower passenger Richard Warren. He served as the president of the Illinois chapter of the Sons of the Revolution.

== List of notable buildings designed ==
While working for H. L. Stevens & Company, Otis designed the following buildings:

- Hotel Bankhead (Birmingham, Alabama)
- Hotel Bothwell (Sedalia, Missouri)
- Hotel Chieftain (Council Bluffs, Iowa)
- Hotel Kirkwood (Des Moines, Iowa)
- Hotel Northland (Marquette, Michigan)
- Hotel Onesto (Canton, Ohio)
- Hotel President (Waterloo, Iowa)
- Hotel Russell-Lamson (Waterloo, Iowa)
- Hotel Vicksburg (Vicksburg, Mississippi)
- Hotel Tallcorn (Marshalltown, Iowa)

While working for the Works Progress Administration, he designed these public housing complexes:

- Cedar Springs Place (Dallas, Texas)
- Cherokee Terrace (Enid, Oklahoma)
- Will Rogers Courts (Oklahoma City, Oklahoma)
- Logan Fontenelle Homes (Omaha, Nebraska)

Otis remodeled the Hotel St. Francis (now Hotel Courtland) in Canton, Ohio while running his own firm. He also remodeled the original Standard Oil Building (now the Michigan Avenue Lofts) in Chicago.
