= Mather (given name) =

Mather is a given name. Notable people with the surname include:

- Mather Byles Almon (1796–1871) Canadian banker, politician, and philanthropist
- Mather Brown (1761–1831), American portrait and historical painter
- Mather Byles (1706–1788), American clergyman
- Mather Byles (loyalist) (1734/35–1814), American clergyman, son of the above
- Mather Byles DesBrisay (1828–1900), Canadian lawyer, judge, politician, and historian
- Mather Zickel (born c. 1970), American actor
