= Mount Mather =

Mount Mather can refer to

- Mount Mather (Alaska) in the Alaska Range
- Mount Mather (Antarctica) in the Prince Charles Mountains of Antarctica
