= Mather Inn =

- U.S. National Register of Historic Places
- Michigan State Historic Site
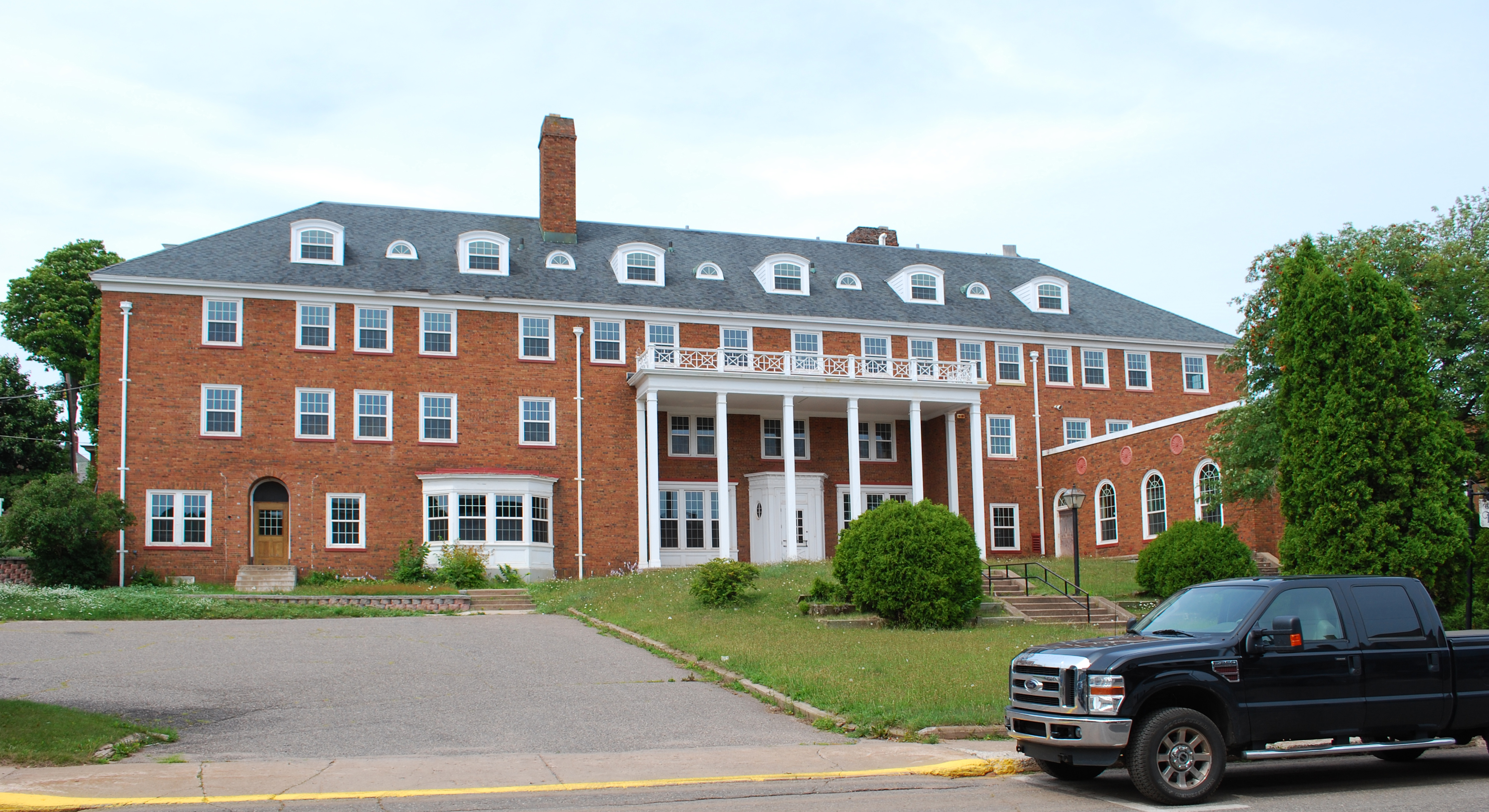

- Location within Michigan Location within the United States
- Interactive map
- Location: 107 Canda St., Ishpeming, Michigan
- Coordinates: 46°29′30″N 87°40′5″W
- Built: 1931
- Architect: James H. Ritchie, Warren H. Manning
- Architectural style: Colonial Revival, Georgian revival vernacular
- NRHP reference No.: 78001505

Significant dates
- Added to NRHP: December 20, 1978
- Designated MSHS: June 18, 1976

The Mather Inn is a former hotel in Ishpeming, Michigan. The inn served as housing for the cast of the classic 1959 movie Anatomy of a Murder, and was the place where Duke Ellington composed the movie's score. It was designated a Michigan State Historic Site in 1976 and listed on the National Register of Historic Places in 1978.

== History ==
In 1875, Robert Nelson, the founder of Ishpeming, built a hotel in the city known as the Barnum House. Four years later, the Barnum House burned, and Nelson replaced it with another structure he called the Nelson House. The Nelson House stood until 1928, when it too burned. The loss of Ishpeming's finest hotel affected the Cleveland-Cliffs Iron Company, which now had no place to house important guests.

Realizing the benefit of having a first-class hotel, William G. Mather, Cleveland-Cliffs president, financed the construction of the Mather Inn as a replacement. Mather hired Boston architect James H. Ritchie to design the building and turned to Warren H. Manning, a longtime associate, to design the grounds. The hotel is considered to be an excellent example of the work of both men.

The Mather Inn opened in 1932, and served the community for decades. In 1959, it served as lodging for the cast of the classic movie Anatomy of a Murder. In the mid-1980s, the Mather Inn Preservation Society was created to sustain it. However, the inn fell on hard times, and in 1987 it was closed and sold.

The inn was vacant for many years, but in 2004 renovations to the building were started. As of 2009, the inn is privately owned and is undergoing a renovation to turn it into luxury residences and office suites.

In 2014, the old boiler room and adjacent storage area were converted into a brewery named Cognition Brewing Company. The brewery served its beer out of the old pub. The brewery closed in 2023 after the hotel's new owners decided to apply for their own liquor license.

== Description ==
The Mather Inn is a four-story rectangular building, constructed of concrete and steel with a brick facing. The front facade is divided into three bays, with a two-story portico sheltering the entrance in the center bay. The varied fenestration on the front, including bay windows flanking the center entrance and dormers on the hipped roof, make the facade architecturally interesting.

The public areas of the interior are panelled in pine, and include a sunken dining room and men's clubroom. There are forty-seven guest rooms, including three furnished apartments. On the exterior, the grounds contain uniform terraced gardens and a huge boulder rock garden. The inn is still substantially similar to its original state, having undergone few alterations.

== See also ==
- Landmark Inn
